

99001–99100 

|-bgcolor=#d6d6d6
| 99001 ||  || — || February 16, 2001 || Socorro || LINEAR || — || align=right | 6.8 km || 
|-id=002 bgcolor=#d6d6d6
| 99002 ||  || — || February 16, 2001 || Socorro || LINEAR || — || align=right | 6.4 km || 
|-id=003 bgcolor=#E9E9E9
| 99003 ||  || — || February 16, 2001 || Socorro || LINEAR || — || align=right | 6.8 km || 
|-id=004 bgcolor=#d6d6d6
| 99004 ||  || — || February 16, 2001 || Socorro || LINEAR || 629 || align=right | 3.8 km || 
|-id=005 bgcolor=#E9E9E9
| 99005 ||  || — || February 17, 2001 || Socorro || LINEAR || — || align=right | 2.5 km || 
|-id=006 bgcolor=#E9E9E9
| 99006 ||  || — || February 17, 2001 || Socorro || LINEAR || EUN || align=right | 2.4 km || 
|-id=007 bgcolor=#d6d6d6
| 99007 ||  || — || February 17, 2001 || Socorro || LINEAR || EOS || align=right | 5.1 km || 
|-id=008 bgcolor=#E9E9E9
| 99008 ||  || — || February 17, 2001 || Socorro || LINEAR || — || align=right | 2.4 km || 
|-id=009 bgcolor=#d6d6d6
| 99009 ||  || — || February 21, 2001 || Desert Beaver || W. K. Y. Yeung || — || align=right | 6.6 km || 
|-id=010 bgcolor=#d6d6d6
| 99010 ||  || — || February 21, 2001 || Desert Beaver || W. K. Y. Yeung || — || align=right | 9.0 km || 
|-id=011 bgcolor=#E9E9E9
| 99011 ||  || — || February 17, 2001 || Socorro || LINEAR || EUN || align=right | 2.7 km || 
|-id=012 bgcolor=#E9E9E9
| 99012 ||  || — || February 19, 2001 || Socorro || LINEAR || INO || align=right | 3.6 km || 
|-id=013 bgcolor=#E9E9E9
| 99013 ||  || — || February 19, 2001 || Socorro || LINEAR || — || align=right | 3.2 km || 
|-id=014 bgcolor=#E9E9E9
| 99014 ||  || — || February 19, 2001 || Socorro || LINEAR || — || align=right | 3.2 km || 
|-id=015 bgcolor=#d6d6d6
| 99015 ||  || — || February 19, 2001 || Socorro || LINEAR || — || align=right | 7.2 km || 
|-id=016 bgcolor=#d6d6d6
| 99016 ||  || — || February 19, 2001 || Socorro || LINEAR || — || align=right | 4.5 km || 
|-id=017 bgcolor=#d6d6d6
| 99017 ||  || — || February 19, 2001 || Socorro || LINEAR || — || align=right | 6.1 km || 
|-id=018 bgcolor=#E9E9E9
| 99018 ||  || — || February 19, 2001 || Socorro || LINEAR || — || align=right | 2.2 km || 
|-id=019 bgcolor=#E9E9E9
| 99019 ||  || — || February 19, 2001 || Socorro || LINEAR || HOF || align=right | 4.6 km || 
|-id=020 bgcolor=#d6d6d6
| 99020 ||  || — || February 20, 2001 || Socorro || LINEAR || HYG || align=right | 6.1 km || 
|-id=021 bgcolor=#E9E9E9
| 99021 ||  || — || February 16, 2001 || Socorro || LINEAR || — || align=right | 2.7 km || 
|-id=022 bgcolor=#E9E9E9
| 99022 ||  || — || February 27, 2001 || Kitt Peak || Spacewatch || — || align=right | 4.0 km || 
|-id=023 bgcolor=#d6d6d6
| 99023 ||  || — || February 27, 2001 || Kitt Peak || Spacewatch || ALA || align=right | 6.1 km || 
|-id=024 bgcolor=#E9E9E9
| 99024 ||  || — || February 22, 2001 || Socorro || LINEAR || — || align=right | 2.9 km || 
|-id=025 bgcolor=#E9E9E9
| 99025 ||  || — || February 20, 2001 || Kitt Peak || Spacewatch || — || align=right | 2.0 km || 
|-id=026 bgcolor=#d6d6d6
| 99026 ||  || — || February 19, 2001 || Anderson Mesa || LONEOS || — || align=right | 5.9 km || 
|-id=027 bgcolor=#E9E9E9
| 99027 ||  || — || February 21, 2001 || Anderson Mesa || LONEOS || — || align=right | 2.2 km || 
|-id=028 bgcolor=#E9E9E9
| 99028 ||  || — || February 17, 2001 || Socorro || LINEAR || — || align=right | 5.7 km || 
|-id=029 bgcolor=#E9E9E9
| 99029 ||  || — || February 17, 2001 || Socorro || LINEAR || — || align=right | 2.2 km || 
|-id=030 bgcolor=#E9E9E9
| 99030 ||  || — || February 17, 2001 || Socorro || LINEAR || — || align=right | 2.5 km || 
|-id=031 bgcolor=#E9E9E9
| 99031 ||  || — || February 17, 2001 || Socorro || LINEAR || EUN || align=right | 4.3 km || 
|-id=032 bgcolor=#d6d6d6
| 99032 ||  || — || February 17, 2001 || La Palma || La Palma Obs. || — || align=right | 4.5 km || 
|-id=033 bgcolor=#E9E9E9
| 99033 ||  || — || February 16, 2001 || Socorro || LINEAR || — || align=right | 6.4 km || 
|-id=034 bgcolor=#E9E9E9
| 99034 ||  || — || February 20, 2001 || Kitt Peak || Spacewatch || — || align=right | 5.0 km || 
|-id=035 bgcolor=#E9E9E9
| 99035 || 2001 EX || — || March 1, 2001 || Socorro || LINEAR || — || align=right | 3.6 km || 
|-id=036 bgcolor=#E9E9E9
| 99036 ||  || — || March 1, 2001 || Socorro || LINEAR || — || align=right | 2.5 km || 
|-id=037 bgcolor=#E9E9E9
| 99037 ||  || — || March 1, 2001 || Socorro || LINEAR || — || align=right | 2.2 km || 
|-id=038 bgcolor=#E9E9E9
| 99038 ||  || — || March 2, 2001 || Haleakala || NEAT || — || align=right | 2.8 km || 
|-id=039 bgcolor=#d6d6d6
| 99039 ||  || — || March 2, 2001 || Anderson Mesa || LONEOS || — || align=right | 3.3 km || 
|-id=040 bgcolor=#E9E9E9
| 99040 ||  || — || March 2, 2001 || Anderson Mesa || LONEOS || EUN || align=right | 2.3 km || 
|-id=041 bgcolor=#E9E9E9
| 99041 ||  || — || March 2, 2001 || Anderson Mesa || LONEOS || AGN || align=right | 2.9 km || 
|-id=042 bgcolor=#E9E9E9
| 99042 ||  || — || March 2, 2001 || Anderson Mesa || LONEOS || GEF || align=right | 4.1 km || 
|-id=043 bgcolor=#E9E9E9
| 99043 ||  || — || March 2, 2001 || Anderson Mesa || LONEOS || — || align=right | 2.3 km || 
|-id=044 bgcolor=#E9E9E9
| 99044 ||  || — || March 2, 2001 || Anderson Mesa || LONEOS || — || align=right | 2.7 km || 
|-id=045 bgcolor=#E9E9E9
| 99045 ||  || — || March 2, 2001 || Anderson Mesa || LONEOS || — || align=right | 4.5 km || 
|-id=046 bgcolor=#d6d6d6
| 99046 ||  || — || March 2, 2001 || Haleakala || NEAT || — || align=right | 5.2 km || 
|-id=047 bgcolor=#fefefe
| 99047 ||  || — || March 14, 2001 || Socorro || LINEAR || H || align=right | 1.7 km || 
|-id=048 bgcolor=#d6d6d6
| 99048 ||  || — || March 15, 2001 || Kitt Peak || Spacewatch || KOR || align=right | 3.0 km || 
|-id=049 bgcolor=#E9E9E9
| 99049 ||  || — || March 14, 2001 || Socorro || LINEAR || — || align=right | 2.2 km || 
|-id=050 bgcolor=#d6d6d6
| 99050 ||  || — || March 15, 2001 || Socorro || LINEAR || — || align=right | 7.5 km || 
|-id=051 bgcolor=#E9E9E9
| 99051 ||  || — || March 15, 2001 || Socorro || LINEAR || MAR || align=right | 2.5 km || 
|-id=052 bgcolor=#E9E9E9
| 99052 ||  || — || March 15, 2001 || Oizumi || T. Kobayashi || — || align=right | 2.6 km || 
|-id=053 bgcolor=#E9E9E9
| 99053 ||  || — || March 15, 2001 || Oizumi || T. Kobayashi || DOR || align=right | 5.1 km || 
|-id=054 bgcolor=#E9E9E9
| 99054 ||  || — || March 15, 2001 || Oizumi || T. Kobayashi || DOR || align=right | 8.1 km || 
|-id=055 bgcolor=#E9E9E9
| 99055 ||  || — || March 15, 2001 || Haleakala || NEAT || — || align=right | 4.1 km || 
|-id=056 bgcolor=#E9E9E9
| 99056 ||  || — || March 15, 2001 || Anderson Mesa || LONEOS || — || align=right | 3.7 km || 
|-id=057 bgcolor=#E9E9E9
| 99057 ||  || — || March 15, 2001 || Anderson Mesa || LONEOS || — || align=right | 4.7 km || 
|-id=058 bgcolor=#E9E9E9
| 99058 ||  || — || March 15, 2001 || Haleakala || NEAT || MIS || align=right | 3.8 km || 
|-id=059 bgcolor=#d6d6d6
| 99059 ||  || — || March 4, 2001 || Socorro || LINEAR || ALA || align=right | 10 km || 
|-id=060 bgcolor=#E9E9E9
| 99060 ||  || — || March 2, 2001 || Anderson Mesa || LONEOS || — || align=right | 2.6 km || 
|-id=061 bgcolor=#E9E9E9
| 99061 ||  || — || March 2, 2001 || Anderson Mesa || LONEOS || — || align=right | 1.5 km || 
|-id=062 bgcolor=#E9E9E9
| 99062 || 2001 FQ || — || March 16, 2001 || Socorro || LINEAR || — || align=right | 5.8 km || 
|-id=063 bgcolor=#E9E9E9
| 99063 ||  || — || March 16, 2001 || Socorro || LINEAR || — || align=right | 6.9 km || 
|-id=064 bgcolor=#E9E9E9
| 99064 ||  || — || March 18, 2001 || Socorro || LINEAR || — || align=right | 2.9 km || 
|-id=065 bgcolor=#d6d6d6
| 99065 ||  || — || March 18, 2001 || Socorro || LINEAR || EOS || align=right | 4.0 km || 
|-id=066 bgcolor=#E9E9E9
| 99066 ||  || — || March 18, 2001 || Socorro || LINEAR || — || align=right | 4.6 km || 
|-id=067 bgcolor=#E9E9E9
| 99067 ||  || — || March 18, 2001 || Socorro || LINEAR || — || align=right | 6.9 km || 
|-id=068 bgcolor=#E9E9E9
| 99068 ||  || — || March 18, 2001 || Socorro || LINEAR || — || align=right | 4.7 km || 
|-id=069 bgcolor=#E9E9E9
| 99069 ||  || — || March 18, 2001 || Socorro || LINEAR || — || align=right | 2.5 km || 
|-id=070 bgcolor=#d6d6d6
| 99070 Strittmatter ||  ||  || March 22, 2001 || Junk Bond || D. Healy || — || align=right | 8.3 km || 
|-id=071 bgcolor=#d6d6d6
| 99071 ||  || — || March 19, 2001 || Anderson Mesa || LONEOS || — || align=right | 4.2 km || 
|-id=072 bgcolor=#E9E9E9
| 99072 ||  || — || March 19, 2001 || Anderson Mesa || LONEOS || ADE || align=right | 3.5 km || 
|-id=073 bgcolor=#E9E9E9
| 99073 ||  || — || March 19, 2001 || Anderson Mesa || LONEOS || — || align=right | 3.0 km || 
|-id=074 bgcolor=#E9E9E9
| 99074 ||  || — || March 19, 2001 || Anderson Mesa || LONEOS || — || align=right | 2.6 km || 
|-id=075 bgcolor=#E9E9E9
| 99075 ||  || — || March 19, 2001 || Anderson Mesa || LONEOS || — || align=right | 3.5 km || 
|-id=076 bgcolor=#E9E9E9
| 99076 ||  || — || March 19, 2001 || Anderson Mesa || LONEOS || — || align=right | 1.7 km || 
|-id=077 bgcolor=#E9E9E9
| 99077 ||  || — || March 19, 2001 || Anderson Mesa || LONEOS || — || align=right | 5.6 km || 
|-id=078 bgcolor=#E9E9E9
| 99078 ||  || — || March 19, 2001 || Anderson Mesa || LONEOS || — || align=right | 2.8 km || 
|-id=079 bgcolor=#d6d6d6
| 99079 ||  || — || March 19, 2001 || Anderson Mesa || LONEOS || — || align=right | 6.9 km || 
|-id=080 bgcolor=#E9E9E9
| 99080 ||  || — || March 19, 2001 || Anderson Mesa || LONEOS || — || align=right | 2.1 km || 
|-id=081 bgcolor=#d6d6d6
| 99081 ||  || — || March 21, 2001 || Anderson Mesa || LONEOS || — || align=right | 6.9 km || 
|-id=082 bgcolor=#d6d6d6
| 99082 ||  || — || March 21, 2001 || Anderson Mesa || LONEOS || — || align=right | 6.6 km || 
|-id=083 bgcolor=#E9E9E9
| 99083 ||  || — || March 18, 2001 || Socorro || LINEAR || — || align=right | 3.1 km || 
|-id=084 bgcolor=#E9E9E9
| 99084 ||  || — || March 18, 2001 || Socorro || LINEAR || — || align=right | 5.1 km || 
|-id=085 bgcolor=#d6d6d6
| 99085 ||  || — || March 18, 2001 || Socorro || LINEAR || — || align=right | 6.7 km || 
|-id=086 bgcolor=#d6d6d6
| 99086 ||  || — || March 18, 2001 || Haleakala || NEAT || — || align=right | 6.9 km || 
|-id=087 bgcolor=#E9E9E9
| 99087 ||  || — || March 19, 2001 || Haleakala || NEAT || — || align=right | 3.0 km || 
|-id=088 bgcolor=#d6d6d6
| 99088 ||  || — || March 18, 2001 || Socorro || LINEAR || — || align=right | 5.3 km || 
|-id=089 bgcolor=#d6d6d6
| 99089 ||  || — || March 18, 2001 || Socorro || LINEAR || — || align=right | 4.4 km || 
|-id=090 bgcolor=#E9E9E9
| 99090 ||  || — || March 18, 2001 || Socorro || LINEAR || — || align=right | 2.2 km || 
|-id=091 bgcolor=#E9E9E9
| 99091 ||  || — || March 18, 2001 || Socorro || LINEAR || — || align=right | 4.0 km || 
|-id=092 bgcolor=#d6d6d6
| 99092 ||  || — || March 18, 2001 || Socorro || LINEAR || — || align=right | 7.5 km || 
|-id=093 bgcolor=#E9E9E9
| 99093 ||  || — || March 18, 2001 || Socorro || LINEAR || — || align=right | 3.2 km || 
|-id=094 bgcolor=#E9E9E9
| 99094 ||  || — || March 18, 2001 || Socorro || LINEAR || ADE || align=right | 2.2 km || 
|-id=095 bgcolor=#E9E9E9
| 99095 ||  || — || March 18, 2001 || Socorro || LINEAR || — || align=right | 3.1 km || 
|-id=096 bgcolor=#d6d6d6
| 99096 ||  || — || March 18, 2001 || Socorro || LINEAR || — || align=right | 6.7 km || 
|-id=097 bgcolor=#E9E9E9
| 99097 ||  || — || March 18, 2001 || Socorro || LINEAR || — || align=right | 2.9 km || 
|-id=098 bgcolor=#d6d6d6
| 99098 ||  || — || March 18, 2001 || Socorro || LINEAR || — || align=right | 7.3 km || 
|-id=099 bgcolor=#E9E9E9
| 99099 ||  || — || March 18, 2001 || Socorro || LINEAR || POS || align=right | 4.1 km || 
|-id=100 bgcolor=#d6d6d6
| 99100 ||  || — || March 18, 2001 || Socorro || LINEAR || — || align=right | 5.6 km || 
|}

99101–99200 

|-bgcolor=#E9E9E9
| 99101 ||  || — || March 18, 2001 || Socorro || LINEAR || — || align=right | 7.2 km || 
|-id=102 bgcolor=#E9E9E9
| 99102 ||  || — || March 18, 2001 || Socorro || LINEAR || EUN || align=right | 4.0 km || 
|-id=103 bgcolor=#E9E9E9
| 99103 ||  || — || March 18, 2001 || Socorro || LINEAR || — || align=right | 3.4 km || 
|-id=104 bgcolor=#E9E9E9
| 99104 ||  || — || March 18, 2001 || Socorro || LINEAR || RAF || align=right | 2.0 km || 
|-id=105 bgcolor=#E9E9E9
| 99105 ||  || — || March 18, 2001 || Socorro || LINEAR || MIS || align=right | 6.0 km || 
|-id=106 bgcolor=#E9E9E9
| 99106 ||  || — || March 18, 2001 || Socorro || LINEAR || EUN || align=right | 4.3 km || 
|-id=107 bgcolor=#E9E9E9
| 99107 ||  || — || March 19, 2001 || Socorro || LINEAR || — || align=right | 2.6 km || 
|-id=108 bgcolor=#d6d6d6
| 99108 ||  || — || March 21, 2001 || Socorro || LINEAR || — || align=right | 12 km || 
|-id=109 bgcolor=#E9E9E9
| 99109 ||  || — || March 23, 2001 || Socorro || LINEAR || — || align=right | 3.9 km || 
|-id=110 bgcolor=#E9E9E9
| 99110 ||  || — || March 23, 2001 || Socorro || LINEAR || RAF || align=right | 1.8 km || 
|-id=111 bgcolor=#fefefe
| 99111 ||  || — || March 19, 2001 || Socorro || LINEAR || — || align=right | 3.0 km || 
|-id=112 bgcolor=#E9E9E9
| 99112 ||  || — || March 19, 2001 || Socorro || LINEAR || NEM || align=right | 5.2 km || 
|-id=113 bgcolor=#d6d6d6
| 99113 ||  || — || March 19, 2001 || Socorro || LINEAR || — || align=right | 6.6 km || 
|-id=114 bgcolor=#E9E9E9
| 99114 ||  || — || March 19, 2001 || Socorro || LINEAR || — || align=right | 3.0 km || 
|-id=115 bgcolor=#E9E9E9
| 99115 ||  || — || March 19, 2001 || Socorro || LINEAR || PAD || align=right | 4.7 km || 
|-id=116 bgcolor=#E9E9E9
| 99116 ||  || — || March 19, 2001 || Socorro || LINEAR || — || align=right | 3.6 km || 
|-id=117 bgcolor=#E9E9E9
| 99117 ||  || — || March 19, 2001 || Socorro || LINEAR || — || align=right | 3.9 km || 
|-id=118 bgcolor=#E9E9E9
| 99118 ||  || — || March 19, 2001 || Socorro || LINEAR || INO || align=right | 2.4 km || 
|-id=119 bgcolor=#d6d6d6
| 99119 ||  || — || March 19, 2001 || Socorro || LINEAR || — || align=right | 4.7 km || 
|-id=120 bgcolor=#E9E9E9
| 99120 ||  || — || March 19, 2001 || Socorro || LINEAR || MRX || align=right | 2.4 km || 
|-id=121 bgcolor=#E9E9E9
| 99121 ||  || — || March 19, 2001 || Socorro || LINEAR || HNS || align=right | 4.0 km || 
|-id=122 bgcolor=#E9E9E9
| 99122 ||  || — || March 19, 2001 || Socorro || LINEAR || — || align=right | 3.2 km || 
|-id=123 bgcolor=#d6d6d6
| 99123 ||  || — || March 19, 2001 || Socorro || LINEAR || EOS || align=right | 5.0 km || 
|-id=124 bgcolor=#E9E9E9
| 99124 ||  || — || March 21, 2001 || Socorro || LINEAR || — || align=right | 5.7 km || 
|-id=125 bgcolor=#E9E9E9
| 99125 ||  || — || March 21, 2001 || Socorro || LINEAR || — || align=right | 4.2 km || 
|-id=126 bgcolor=#E9E9E9
| 99126 ||  || — || March 23, 2001 || Socorro || LINEAR || MAR || align=right | 4.2 km || 
|-id=127 bgcolor=#E9E9E9
| 99127 ||  || — || March 21, 2001 || Anderson Mesa || LONEOS || — || align=right | 5.6 km || 
|-id=128 bgcolor=#d6d6d6
| 99128 ||  || — || March 16, 2001 || Socorro || LINEAR || VER || align=right | 6.6 km || 
|-id=129 bgcolor=#E9E9E9
| 99129 ||  || — || March 16, 2001 || Socorro || LINEAR || — || align=right | 3.1 km || 
|-id=130 bgcolor=#E9E9E9
| 99130 ||  || — || March 16, 2001 || Socorro || LINEAR || MIT || align=right | 5.3 km || 
|-id=131 bgcolor=#E9E9E9
| 99131 ||  || — || March 16, 2001 || Kitt Peak || Spacewatch || AST || align=right | 4.7 km || 
|-id=132 bgcolor=#E9E9E9
| 99132 ||  || — || March 16, 2001 || Socorro || LINEAR || — || align=right | 2.3 km || 
|-id=133 bgcolor=#E9E9E9
| 99133 ||  || — || March 16, 2001 || Socorro || LINEAR || — || align=right | 2.9 km || 
|-id=134 bgcolor=#E9E9E9
| 99134 ||  || — || March 16, 2001 || Kitt Peak || Spacewatch || — || align=right | 3.8 km || 
|-id=135 bgcolor=#E9E9E9
| 99135 ||  || — || March 16, 2001 || Socorro || LINEAR || — || align=right | 3.1 km || 
|-id=136 bgcolor=#E9E9E9
| 99136 ||  || — || March 16, 2001 || Socorro || LINEAR || — || align=right | 3.5 km || 
|-id=137 bgcolor=#E9E9E9
| 99137 ||  || — || March 17, 2001 || Socorro || LINEAR || — || align=right | 4.7 km || 
|-id=138 bgcolor=#d6d6d6
| 99138 ||  || — || March 17, 2001 || Socorro || LINEAR || — || align=right | 5.0 km || 
|-id=139 bgcolor=#E9E9E9
| 99139 ||  || — || March 18, 2001 || Socorro || LINEAR || — || align=right | 3.1 km || 
|-id=140 bgcolor=#d6d6d6
| 99140 ||  || — || March 18, 2001 || Anderson Mesa || LONEOS || CHA || align=right | 3.9 km || 
|-id=141 bgcolor=#d6d6d6
| 99141 ||  || — || March 18, 2001 || Anderson Mesa || LONEOS || — || align=right | 7.1 km || 
|-id=142 bgcolor=#E9E9E9
| 99142 ||  || — || March 18, 2001 || Anderson Mesa || LONEOS || WIT || align=right | 2.6 km || 
|-id=143 bgcolor=#E9E9E9
| 99143 ||  || — || March 18, 2001 || Socorro || LINEAR || AST || align=right | 4.8 km || 
|-id=144 bgcolor=#E9E9E9
| 99144 ||  || — || March 18, 2001 || Haleakala || NEAT || VIB || align=right | 4.6 km || 
|-id=145 bgcolor=#d6d6d6
| 99145 ||  || — || March 18, 2001 || Haleakala || NEAT || VER || align=right | 6.7 km || 
|-id=146 bgcolor=#E9E9E9
| 99146 ||  || — || March 19, 2001 || Socorro || LINEAR || — || align=right | 7.4 km || 
|-id=147 bgcolor=#d6d6d6
| 99147 ||  || — || March 19, 2001 || Socorro || LINEAR || — || align=right | 5.6 km || 
|-id=148 bgcolor=#E9E9E9
| 99148 ||  || — || March 23, 2001 || Haleakala || NEAT || — || align=right | 2.9 km || 
|-id=149 bgcolor=#E9E9E9
| 99149 ||  || — || March 23, 2001 || Anderson Mesa || LONEOS || — || align=right | 3.6 km || 
|-id=150 bgcolor=#E9E9E9
| 99150 ||  || — || March 29, 2001 || Kitt Peak || Spacewatch || AGN || align=right | 2.5 km || 
|-id=151 bgcolor=#E9E9E9
| 99151 ||  || — || March 23, 2001 || Črni Vrh || Črni Vrh || MAR || align=right | 3.4 km || 
|-id=152 bgcolor=#E9E9E9
| 99152 ||  || — || March 26, 2001 || Socorro || LINEAR || HNS || align=right | 2.2 km || 
|-id=153 bgcolor=#E9E9E9
| 99153 ||  || — || March 26, 2001 || Socorro || LINEAR || VIB || align=right | 4.8 km || 
|-id=154 bgcolor=#E9E9E9
| 99154 ||  || — || March 29, 2001 || Socorro || LINEAR || — || align=right | 4.7 km || 
|-id=155 bgcolor=#E9E9E9
| 99155 ||  || — || March 29, 2001 || Socorro || LINEAR || — || align=right | 3.7 km || 
|-id=156 bgcolor=#E9E9E9
| 99156 ||  || — || March 20, 2001 || Haleakala || NEAT || — || align=right | 5.0 km || 
|-id=157 bgcolor=#E9E9E9
| 99157 ||  || — || March 20, 2001 || Haleakala || NEAT || PAE || align=right | 5.5 km || 
|-id=158 bgcolor=#d6d6d6
| 99158 ||  || — || March 20, 2001 || Haleakala || NEAT || — || align=right | 6.4 km || 
|-id=159 bgcolor=#d6d6d6
| 99159 ||  || — || March 20, 2001 || Haleakala || NEAT || — || align=right | 7.1 km || 
|-id=160 bgcolor=#E9E9E9
| 99160 ||  || — || March 21, 2001 || Anderson Mesa || LONEOS || EUN || align=right | 2.6 km || 
|-id=161 bgcolor=#d6d6d6
| 99161 ||  || — || March 21, 2001 || Anderson Mesa || LONEOS || — || align=right | 6.7 km || 
|-id=162 bgcolor=#d6d6d6
| 99162 ||  || — || March 21, 2001 || Anderson Mesa || LONEOS || — || align=right | 4.5 km || 
|-id=163 bgcolor=#E9E9E9
| 99163 ||  || — || March 21, 2001 || Haleakala || NEAT || MRX || align=right | 2.2 km || 
|-id=164 bgcolor=#d6d6d6
| 99164 ||  || — || March 23, 2001 || Kitt Peak || Spacewatch || Tj (2.95) || align=right | 7.9 km || 
|-id=165 bgcolor=#E9E9E9
| 99165 ||  || — || March 24, 2001 || Anderson Mesa || LONEOS || — || align=right | 3.9 km || 
|-id=166 bgcolor=#E9E9E9
| 99166 ||  || — || March 24, 2001 || Anderson Mesa || LONEOS || — || align=right | 2.4 km || 
|-id=167 bgcolor=#d6d6d6
| 99167 ||  || — || March 24, 2001 || Haleakala || NEAT || 7:4 || align=right | 14 km || 
|-id=168 bgcolor=#E9E9E9
| 99168 ||  || — || March 26, 2001 || Socorro || LINEAR || — || align=right | 2.5 km || 
|-id=169 bgcolor=#d6d6d6
| 99169 ||  || — || March 26, 2001 || Socorro || LINEAR || — || align=right | 5.7 km || 
|-id=170 bgcolor=#E9E9E9
| 99170 ||  || — || March 29, 2001 || Anderson Mesa || LONEOS || — || align=right | 2.3 km || 
|-id=171 bgcolor=#E9E9E9
| 99171 ||  || — || March 29, 2001 || Anderson Mesa || LONEOS || — || align=right | 2.2 km || 
|-id=172 bgcolor=#E9E9E9
| 99172 ||  || — || March 29, 2001 || Anderson Mesa || LONEOS || WIT || align=right | 2.3 km || 
|-id=173 bgcolor=#E9E9E9
| 99173 ||  || — || March 30, 2001 || Socorro || LINEAR || — || align=right | 5.9 km || 
|-id=174 bgcolor=#d6d6d6
| 99174 ||  || — || March 18, 2001 || Anderson Mesa || LONEOS || EOS || align=right | 4.6 km || 
|-id=175 bgcolor=#E9E9E9
| 99175 ||  || — || March 18, 2001 || Kitt Peak || Spacewatch || — || align=right | 4.3 km || 
|-id=176 bgcolor=#d6d6d6
| 99176 ||  || — || March 18, 2001 || Socorro || LINEAR || VER || align=right | 6.1 km || 
|-id=177 bgcolor=#E9E9E9
| 99177 ||  || — || March 25, 2001 || Anderson Mesa || LONEOS || — || align=right | 3.6 km || 
|-id=178 bgcolor=#d6d6d6
| 99178 ||  || — || March 25, 2001 || Anderson Mesa || LONEOS || JLI || align=right | 4.8 km || 
|-id=179 bgcolor=#d6d6d6
| 99179 ||  || — || March 31, 2001 || Socorro || LINEAR || NAE || align=right | 6.5 km || 
|-id=180 bgcolor=#d6d6d6
| 99180 ||  || — || March 16, 2001 || Socorro || LINEAR || — || align=right | 7.5 km || 
|-id=181 bgcolor=#fefefe
| 99181 ||  || — || March 16, 2001 || Socorro || LINEAR || — || align=right | 1.9 km || 
|-id=182 bgcolor=#E9E9E9
| 99182 ||  || — || March 20, 2001 || Anderson Mesa || LONEOS || MAR || align=right | 3.8 km || 
|-id=183 bgcolor=#d6d6d6
| 99183 ||  || — || March 20, 2001 || Anderson Mesa || LONEOS || EOS || align=right | 4.5 km || 
|-id=184 bgcolor=#E9E9E9
| 99184 ||  || — || March 16, 2001 || Socorro || LINEAR || EUN || align=right | 2.6 km || 
|-id=185 bgcolor=#E9E9E9
| 99185 ||  || — || March 16, 2001 || Socorro || LINEAR || — || align=right | 2.6 km || 
|-id=186 bgcolor=#E9E9E9
| 99186 ||  || — || March 18, 2001 || Socorro || LINEAR || — || align=right | 3.3 km || 
|-id=187 bgcolor=#d6d6d6
| 99187 ||  || — || March 18, 2001 || Anderson Mesa || LONEOS || — || align=right | 5.7 km || 
|-id=188 bgcolor=#E9E9E9
| 99188 ||  || — || March 19, 2001 || Anderson Mesa || LONEOS || DOR || align=right | 4.6 km || 
|-id=189 bgcolor=#E9E9E9
| 99189 ||  || — || March 19, 2001 || Socorro || LINEAR || — || align=right | 4.5 km || 
|-id=190 bgcolor=#E9E9E9
| 99190 ||  || — || March 18, 2001 || Anderson Mesa || LONEOS || — || align=right | 5.1 km || 
|-id=191 bgcolor=#d6d6d6
| 99191 ||  || — || March 23, 2001 || Anderson Mesa || LONEOS || URS || align=right | 7.4 km || 
|-id=192 bgcolor=#E9E9E9
| 99192 ||  || — || April 14, 2001 || Črni Vrh || Črni Vrh || EUN || align=right | 3.0 km || 
|-id=193 bgcolor=#d6d6d6
| 99193 Obsfabra ||  ||  || April 14, 2001 || Begues || J. Manteca || — || align=right | 8.8 km || 
|-id=194 bgcolor=#E9E9E9
| 99194 ||  || — || April 15, 2001 || Socorro || LINEAR || — || align=right | 2.6 km || 
|-id=195 bgcolor=#E9E9E9
| 99195 ||  || — || April 15, 2001 || Socorro || LINEAR || HNS || align=right | 3.2 km || 
|-id=196 bgcolor=#E9E9E9
| 99196 ||  || — || April 15, 2001 || Socorro || LINEAR || — || align=right | 2.7 km || 
|-id=197 bgcolor=#E9E9E9
| 99197 ||  || — || April 15, 2001 || Haleakala || NEAT || — || align=right | 3.6 km || 
|-id=198 bgcolor=#d6d6d6
| 99198 ||  || — || April 17, 2001 || Socorro || LINEAR || — || align=right | 7.0 km || 
|-id=199 bgcolor=#d6d6d6
| 99199 ||  || — || April 18, 2001 || Socorro || LINEAR || — || align=right | 6.7 km || 
|-id=200 bgcolor=#E9E9E9
| 99200 ||  || — || April 23, 2001 || Anderson Mesa || LONEOS || — || align=right | 4.2 km || 
|}

99201–99300 

|-bgcolor=#E9E9E9
| 99201 Sattler ||  ||  || April 25, 2001 || Prescott || P. G. Comba || — || align=right | 3.3 km || 
|-id=202 bgcolor=#d6d6d6
| 99202 ||  || — || April 24, 2001 || Haleakala || NEAT || — || align=right | 10 km || 
|-id=203 bgcolor=#d6d6d6
| 99203 ||  || — || April 26, 2001 || Socorro || LINEAR || — || align=right | 6.8 km || 
|-id=204 bgcolor=#d6d6d6
| 99204 ||  || — || April 26, 2001 || Socorro || LINEAR || — || align=right | 8.6 km || 
|-id=205 bgcolor=#E9E9E9
| 99205 ||  || — || April 25, 2001 || Ametlla de Mar || Ametlla de Mar Obs. || — || align=right | 3.7 km || 
|-id=206 bgcolor=#E9E9E9
| 99206 ||  || — || April 26, 2001 || Kitt Peak || Spacewatch || AGN || align=right | 2.4 km || 
|-id=207 bgcolor=#fefefe
| 99207 ||  || — || April 27, 2001 || Socorro || LINEAR || MAS || align=right | 1.8 km || 
|-id=208 bgcolor=#d6d6d6
| 99208 ||  || — || April 27, 2001 || Socorro || LINEAR || — || align=right | 7.6 km || 
|-id=209 bgcolor=#E9E9E9
| 99209 ||  || — || April 27, 2001 || Socorro || LINEAR || — || align=right | 3.2 km || 
|-id=210 bgcolor=#E9E9E9
| 99210 ||  || — || April 23, 2001 || Socorro || LINEAR || — || align=right | 2.2 km || 
|-id=211 bgcolor=#E9E9E9
| 99211 ||  || — || April 29, 2001 || Socorro || LINEAR || — || align=right | 2.5 km || 
|-id=212 bgcolor=#E9E9E9
| 99212 ||  || — || April 30, 2001 || Desert Beaver || W. K. Y. Yeung || — || align=right | 5.1 km || 
|-id=213 bgcolor=#E9E9E9
| 99213 ||  || — || April 30, 2001 || Desert Beaver || W. K. Y. Yeung || — || align=right | 5.1 km || 
|-id=214 bgcolor=#E9E9E9
| 99214 ||  || — || April 27, 2001 || Socorro || LINEAR || — || align=right | 2.9 km || 
|-id=215 bgcolor=#d6d6d6
| 99215 ||  || — || April 17, 2001 || Anderson Mesa || LONEOS || — || align=right | 4.5 km || 
|-id=216 bgcolor=#E9E9E9
| 99216 ||  || — || April 21, 2001 || Socorro || LINEAR || EUN || align=right | 2.4 km || 
|-id=217 bgcolor=#E9E9E9
| 99217 ||  || — || April 21, 2001 || Socorro || LINEAR || — || align=right | 2.6 km || 
|-id=218 bgcolor=#E9E9E9
| 99218 ||  || — || April 23, 2001 || Socorro || LINEAR || — || align=right | 2.7 km || 
|-id=219 bgcolor=#d6d6d6
| 99219 ||  || — || April 24, 2001 || Anderson Mesa || LONEOS || ALA || align=right | 9.2 km || 
|-id=220 bgcolor=#d6d6d6
| 99220 ||  || — || April 24, 2001 || Anderson Mesa || LONEOS || — || align=right | 5.1 km || 
|-id=221 bgcolor=#E9E9E9
| 99221 ||  || — || April 24, 2001 || Socorro || LINEAR || DOR || align=right | 5.3 km || 
|-id=222 bgcolor=#E9E9E9
| 99222 ||  || — || April 24, 2001 || Socorro || LINEAR || — || align=right | 4.6 km || 
|-id=223 bgcolor=#E9E9E9
| 99223 ||  || — || April 25, 2001 || Anderson Mesa || LONEOS || MIT || align=right | 5.6 km || 
|-id=224 bgcolor=#d6d6d6
| 99224 ||  || — || April 25, 2001 || Anderson Mesa || LONEOS || — || align=right | 6.3 km || 
|-id=225 bgcolor=#E9E9E9
| 99225 ||  || — || April 23, 2001 || Socorro || LINEAR || — || align=right | 2.8 km || 
|-id=226 bgcolor=#E9E9E9
| 99226 ||  || — || April 24, 2001 || Anderson Mesa || LONEOS || — || align=right | 5.1 km || 
|-id=227 bgcolor=#d6d6d6
| 99227 ||  || — || April 24, 2001 || Anderson Mesa || LONEOS || — || align=right | 11 km || 
|-id=228 bgcolor=#E9E9E9
| 99228 ||  || — || April 26, 2001 || Anderson Mesa || LONEOS || — || align=right | 2.2 km || 
|-id=229 bgcolor=#d6d6d6
| 99229 ||  || — || April 26, 2001 || Anderson Mesa || LONEOS || — || align=right | 6.9 km || 
|-id=230 bgcolor=#E9E9E9
| 99230 || 2001 KL || — || May 17, 2001 || Socorro || LINEAR || — || align=right | 3.2 km || 
|-id=231 bgcolor=#d6d6d6
| 99231 ||  || — || May 17, 2001 || Socorro || LINEAR || HYG || align=right | 6.5 km || 
|-id=232 bgcolor=#d6d6d6
| 99232 ||  || — || May 17, 2001 || Socorro || LINEAR || EOS || align=right | 4.4 km || 
|-id=233 bgcolor=#d6d6d6
| 99233 ||  || — || May 17, 2001 || Socorro || LINEAR || — || align=right | 7.4 km || 
|-id=234 bgcolor=#fefefe
| 99234 ||  || — || May 17, 2001 || Socorro || LINEAR || MAS || align=right | 1.8 km || 
|-id=235 bgcolor=#d6d6d6
| 99235 ||  || — || May 21, 2001 || Socorro || LINEAR || — || align=right | 4.0 km || 
|-id=236 bgcolor=#E9E9E9
| 99236 ||  || — || May 22, 2001 || Socorro || LINEAR || — || align=right | 7.5 km || 
|-id=237 bgcolor=#E9E9E9
| 99237 ||  || — || May 24, 2001 || Reedy Creek || J. Broughton || — || align=right | 6.2 km || 
|-id=238 bgcolor=#d6d6d6
| 99238 ||  || — || May 18, 2001 || Socorro || LINEAR || — || align=right | 7.9 km || 
|-id=239 bgcolor=#d6d6d6
| 99239 ||  || — || May 21, 2001 || Socorro || LINEAR || HYG || align=right | 6.1 km || 
|-id=240 bgcolor=#d6d6d6
| 99240 ||  || — || May 21, 2001 || Socorro || LINEAR || — || align=right | 8.6 km || 
|-id=241 bgcolor=#d6d6d6
| 99241 ||  || — || May 16, 2001 || Kitt Peak || Spacewatch || — || align=right | 7.2 km || 
|-id=242 bgcolor=#E9E9E9
| 99242 ||  || — || May 17, 2001 || Kitt Peak || Spacewatch || GEF || align=right | 2.6 km || 
|-id=243 bgcolor=#d6d6d6
| 99243 ||  || — || May 22, 2001 || Haleakala || NEAT || — || align=right | 5.0 km || 
|-id=244 bgcolor=#E9E9E9
| 99244 ||  || — || May 28, 2001 || Socorro || LINEAR || TIN || align=right | 5.1 km || 
|-id=245 bgcolor=#E9E9E9
| 99245 ||  || — || May 17, 2001 || Haleakala || NEAT || DOR || align=right | 4.4 km || 
|-id=246 bgcolor=#E9E9E9
| 99246 ||  || — || May 18, 2001 || Anderson Mesa || LONEOS || — || align=right | 2.8 km || 
|-id=247 bgcolor=#d6d6d6
| 99247 ||  || — || May 22, 2001 || Anderson Mesa || LONEOS || — || align=right | 7.9 km || 
|-id=248 bgcolor=#FFC2E0
| 99248 ||  || — || May 29, 2001 || Palomar || NEAT || APO +1kmPHA || align=right | 1.1 km || 
|-id=249 bgcolor=#d6d6d6
| 99249 ||  || — || May 24, 2001 || Anderson Mesa || LONEOS || HYG || align=right | 5.1 km || 
|-id=250 bgcolor=#d6d6d6
| 99250 || 2001 LH || — || June 10, 2001 || Desert Beaver || W. K. Y. Yeung || TIR || align=right | 5.4 km || 
|-id=251 bgcolor=#d6d6d6
| 99251 || 2001 LM || — || June 13, 2001 || Kitt Peak || Spacewatch || HIL3:2 || align=right | 10 km || 
|-id=252 bgcolor=#E9E9E9
| 99252 ||  || — || June 13, 2001 || Socorro || LINEAR || — || align=right | 3.8 km || 
|-id=253 bgcolor=#d6d6d6
| 99253 ||  || — || June 13, 2001 || Socorro || LINEAR || — || align=right | 6.8 km || 
|-id=254 bgcolor=#d6d6d6
| 99254 ||  || — || June 15, 2001 || Socorro || LINEAR || — || align=right | 8.0 km || 
|-id=255 bgcolor=#d6d6d6
| 99255 ||  || — || June 15, 2001 || Socorro || LINEAR || Tj (2.99) || align=right | 7.3 km || 
|-id=256 bgcolor=#d6d6d6
| 99256 ||  || — || June 15, 2001 || Socorro || LINEAR || TIR || align=right | 9.3 km || 
|-id=257 bgcolor=#d6d6d6
| 99257 ||  || — || June 15, 2001 || Socorro || LINEAR || — || align=right | 3.8 km || 
|-id=258 bgcolor=#d6d6d6
| 99258 ||  || — || June 21, 2001 || Calar Alto || Calar Alto Obs. || — || align=right | 5.5 km || 
|-id=259 bgcolor=#d6d6d6
| 99259 ||  || — || June 26, 2001 || Kitt Peak || Spacewatch || — || align=right | 4.5 km || 
|-id=260 bgcolor=#fefefe
| 99260 ||  || — || June 23, 2001 || Palomar || NEAT || V || align=right | 1.3 km || 
|-id=261 bgcolor=#d6d6d6
| 99261 ||  || — || July 15, 2001 || Haleakala || NEAT || — || align=right | 5.7 km || 
|-id=262 bgcolor=#d6d6d6
| 99262 Bleustein ||  ||  || July 20, 2001 || Le Creusot || J.-C. Merlin || EOS || align=right | 5.0 km || 
|-id=263 bgcolor=#fefefe
| 99263 ||  || — || July 23, 2001 || Palomar || NEAT || H || align=right | 1.5 km || 
|-id=264 bgcolor=#fefefe
| 99264 ||  || — || July 22, 2001 || Palomar || NEAT || — || align=right | 1.9 km || 
|-id=265 bgcolor=#d6d6d6
| 99265 ||  || — || July 20, 2001 || Anderson Mesa || LONEOS || — || align=right | 4.1 km || 
|-id=266 bgcolor=#fefefe
| 99266 ||  || — || July 19, 2001 || Anderson Mesa || LONEOS || — || align=right | 2.4 km || 
|-id=267 bgcolor=#d6d6d6
| 99267 ||  || — || July 18, 2001 || Kitt Peak || Spacewatch || EUP || align=right | 8.9 km || 
|-id=268 bgcolor=#d6d6d6
| 99268 ||  || — || July 27, 2001 || Anderson Mesa || LONEOS || BRA || align=right | 3.8 km || 
|-id=269 bgcolor=#d6d6d6
| 99269 ||  || — || July 25, 2001 || Haleakala || NEAT || EUP || align=right | 9.2 km || 
|-id=270 bgcolor=#fefefe
| 99270 ||  || — || July 25, 2001 || Palomar || NEAT || H || align=right | 1.6 km || 
|-id=271 bgcolor=#d6d6d6
| 99271 ||  || — || August 3, 2001 || Haleakala || NEAT || HYG || align=right | 6.4 km || 
|-id=272 bgcolor=#d6d6d6
| 99272 ||  || — || August 11, 2001 || Haleakala || NEAT || MEL || align=right | 8.4 km || 
|-id=273 bgcolor=#d6d6d6
| 99273 ||  || — || August 14, 2001 || Palomar || NEAT || — || align=right | 4.6 km || 
|-id=274 bgcolor=#E9E9E9
| 99274 ||  || — || August 11, 2001 || Palomar || NEAT || — || align=right | 3.9 km || 
|-id=275 bgcolor=#E9E9E9
| 99275 ||  || — || August 14, 2001 || Haleakala || NEAT || PAD || align=right | 4.3 km || 
|-id=276 bgcolor=#d6d6d6
| 99276 ||  || — || August 16, 2001 || Socorro || LINEAR || 3:2 || align=right | 11 km || 
|-id=277 bgcolor=#fefefe
| 99277 ||  || — || August 17, 2001 || Socorro || LINEAR || H || align=right | 2.0 km || 
|-id=278 bgcolor=#FA8072
| 99278 ||  || — || August 16, 2001 || Kitt Peak || Spacewatch || H || align=right | 1.1 km || 
|-id=279 bgcolor=#d6d6d6
| 99279 ||  || — || August 17, 2001 || Socorro || LINEAR || — || align=right | 7.2 km || 
|-id=280 bgcolor=#fefefe
| 99280 ||  || — || August 17, 2001 || Socorro || LINEAR || — || align=right | 1.7 km || 
|-id=281 bgcolor=#fefefe
| 99281 ||  || — || August 16, 2001 || Socorro || LINEAR || H || align=right | 1.2 km || 
|-id=282 bgcolor=#fefefe
| 99282 ||  || — || August 17, 2001 || Socorro || LINEAR || FLO || align=right | 1.8 km || 
|-id=283 bgcolor=#E9E9E9
| 99283 ||  || — || August 18, 2001 || Socorro || LINEAR || — || align=right | 3.2 km || 
|-id=284 bgcolor=#d6d6d6
| 99284 ||  || — || August 20, 2001 || Socorro || LINEAR || EOS || align=right | 3.6 km || 
|-id=285 bgcolor=#fefefe
| 99285 ||  || — || August 22, 2001 || Socorro || LINEAR || H || align=right | 1.6 km || 
|-id=286 bgcolor=#fefefe
| 99286 ||  || — || August 22, 2001 || Socorro || LINEAR || H || align=right | 2.4 km || 
|-id=287 bgcolor=#d6d6d6
| 99287 ||  || — || August 24, 2001 || Haleakala || NEAT || — || align=right | 6.3 km || 
|-id=288 bgcolor=#E9E9E9
| 99288 ||  || — || August 23, 2001 || Anderson Mesa || LONEOS || PAD || align=right | 3.5 km || 
|-id=289 bgcolor=#d6d6d6
| 99289 ||  || — || August 23, 2001 || Anderson Mesa || LONEOS || — || align=right | 7.5 km || 
|-id=290 bgcolor=#E9E9E9
| 99290 ||  || — || August 23, 2001 || Anderson Mesa || LONEOS || — || align=right | 2.8 km || 
|-id=291 bgcolor=#E9E9E9
| 99291 ||  || — || August 24, 2001 || Anderson Mesa || LONEOS || RAF || align=right | 2.0 km || 
|-id=292 bgcolor=#d6d6d6
| 99292 ||  || — || August 24, 2001 || Anderson Mesa || LONEOS || — || align=right | 9.3 km || 
|-id=293 bgcolor=#E9E9E9
| 99293 ||  || — || August 25, 2001 || Socorro || LINEAR || GEF || align=right | 3.2 km || 
|-id=294 bgcolor=#d6d6d6
| 99294 ||  || — || August 25, 2001 || Socorro || LINEAR || ALA || align=right | 8.9 km || 
|-id=295 bgcolor=#d6d6d6
| 99295 ||  || — || August 19, 2001 || Socorro || LINEAR || HYG || align=right | 5.3 km || 
|-id=296 bgcolor=#fefefe
| 99296 ||  || — || August 17, 2001 || Socorro || LINEAR || ERI || align=right | 3.7 km || 
|-id=297 bgcolor=#FA8072
| 99297 ||  || — || September 10, 2001 || Socorro || LINEAR || — || align=right | 1.8 km || 
|-id=298 bgcolor=#fefefe
| 99298 ||  || — || September 11, 2001 || Socorro || LINEAR || H || align=right | 1.2 km || 
|-id=299 bgcolor=#fefefe
| 99299 ||  || — || September 11, 2001 || Socorro || LINEAR || H || align=right | 1.7 km || 
|-id=300 bgcolor=#d6d6d6
| 99300 ||  || — || September 12, 2001 || Socorro || LINEAR || 3:2 || align=right | 9.7 km || 
|}

99301–99400 

|-bgcolor=#d6d6d6
| 99301 ||  || — || September 11, 2001 || Anderson Mesa || LONEOS || KOR || align=right | 3.1 km || 
|-id=302 bgcolor=#d6d6d6
| 99302 ||  || — || September 11, 2001 || Anderson Mesa || LONEOS || — || align=right | 5.2 km || 
|-id=303 bgcolor=#E9E9E9
| 99303 ||  || — || September 17, 2001 || Desert Eagle || W. K. Y. Yeung || — || align=right | 2.2 km || 
|-id=304 bgcolor=#d6d6d6
| 99304 ||  || — || September 16, 2001 || Socorro || LINEAR || — || align=right | 5.6 km || 
|-id=305 bgcolor=#fefefe
| 99305 ||  || — || September 16, 2001 || Socorro || LINEAR || V || align=right | 1.4 km || 
|-id=306 bgcolor=#C2FFFF
| 99306 ||  || — || September 20, 2001 || Socorro || LINEAR || L5 || align=right | 16 km || 
|-id=307 bgcolor=#d6d6d6
| 99307 ||  || — || September 19, 2001 || Socorro || LINEAR || — || align=right | 4.6 km || 
|-id=308 bgcolor=#C2FFFF
| 99308 ||  || — || September 19, 2001 || Socorro || LINEAR || L5 || align=right | 20 km || 
|-id=309 bgcolor=#C2FFFF
| 99309 ||  || — || September 25, 2001 || Socorro || LINEAR || L5 || align=right | 18 km || 
|-id=310 bgcolor=#fefefe
| 99310 ||  || — || September 22, 2001 || Anderson Mesa || LONEOS || H || align=right | 1.2 km || 
|-id=311 bgcolor=#C2FFFF
| 99311 ||  || — || September 21, 2001 || Socorro || LINEAR || L5 || align=right | 19 km || 
|-id=312 bgcolor=#fefefe
| 99312 ||  || — || September 29, 2001 || Palomar || NEAT || H || align=right | 1.4 km || 
|-id=313 bgcolor=#fefefe
| 99313 ||  || — || October 14, 2001 || Socorro || LINEAR || — || align=right | 2.4 km || 
|-id=314 bgcolor=#E9E9E9
| 99314 ||  || — || October 14, 2001 || Socorro || LINEAR || HOF || align=right | 5.0 km || 
|-id=315 bgcolor=#fefefe
| 99315 ||  || — || October 15, 2001 || Socorro || LINEAR || H || align=right | 1.5 km || 
|-id=316 bgcolor=#fefefe
| 99316 ||  || — || October 13, 2001 || Socorro || LINEAR || — || align=right | 1.2 km || 
|-id=317 bgcolor=#d6d6d6
| 99317 ||  || — || October 13, 2001 || Socorro || LINEAR || — || align=right | 5.0 km || 
|-id=318 bgcolor=#E9E9E9
| 99318 ||  || — || October 14, 2001 || Socorro || LINEAR || AGN || align=right | 2.0 km || 
|-id=319 bgcolor=#E9E9E9
| 99319 ||  || — || October 14, 2001 || Socorro || LINEAR || — || align=right | 3.2 km || 
|-id=320 bgcolor=#fefefe
| 99320 ||  || — || October 15, 2001 || Desert Eagle || W. K. Y. Yeung || — || align=right | 2.1 km || 
|-id=321 bgcolor=#FA8072
| 99321 ||  || — || October 14, 2001 || Socorro || LINEAR || — || align=right | 1.2 km || 
|-id=322 bgcolor=#d6d6d6
| 99322 ||  || — || October 14, 2001 || Palomar || NEAT || — || align=right | 4.3 km || 
|-id=323 bgcolor=#C2FFFF
| 99323 ||  || — || October 11, 2001 || Socorro || LINEAR || L5 || align=right | 17 km || 
|-id=324 bgcolor=#fefefe
| 99324 ||  || — || October 18, 2001 || Socorro || LINEAR || H || align=right | 1.3 km || 
|-id=325 bgcolor=#fefefe
| 99325 ||  || — || October 23, 2001 || Socorro || LINEAR || H || align=right | 1.2 km || 
|-id=326 bgcolor=#d6d6d6
| 99326 ||  || — || October 18, 2001 || Socorro || LINEAR || — || align=right | 6.8 km || 
|-id=327 bgcolor=#C2FFFF
| 99327 ||  || — || October 16, 2001 || Socorro || LINEAR || L5 || align=right | 17 km || 
|-id=328 bgcolor=#C2FFFF
| 99328 ||  || — || October 22, 2001 || Palomar || NEAT || L5 || align=right | 16 km || 
|-id=329 bgcolor=#E9E9E9
| 99329 ||  || — || November 10, 2001 || Socorro || LINEAR || — || align=right | 5.1 km || 
|-id=330 bgcolor=#fefefe
| 99330 ||  || — || November 10, 2001 || Socorro || LINEAR || — || align=right | 5.0 km || 
|-id=331 bgcolor=#fefefe
| 99331 ||  || — || November 9, 2001 || Socorro || LINEAR || — || align=right | 1.8 km || 
|-id=332 bgcolor=#E9E9E9
| 99332 ||  || — || November 10, 2001 || Socorro || LINEAR || — || align=right | 3.8 km || 
|-id=333 bgcolor=#fefefe
| 99333 ||  || — || November 12, 2001 || Haleakala || NEAT || FLO || align=right | 1.7 km || 
|-id=334 bgcolor=#C2FFFF
| 99334 ||  || — || November 15, 2001 || Socorro || LINEAR || L5 || align=right | 26 km || 
|-id=335 bgcolor=#E9E9E9
| 99335 ||  || — || November 12, 2001 || Socorro || LINEAR || — || align=right | 4.7 km || 
|-id=336 bgcolor=#d6d6d6
| 99336 ||  || — || November 12, 2001 || Socorro || LINEAR || — || align=right | 6.5 km || 
|-id=337 bgcolor=#fefefe
| 99337 ||  || — || December 9, 2001 || Socorro || LINEAR || — || align=right | 2.5 km || 
|-id=338 bgcolor=#E9E9E9
| 99338 ||  || — || December 10, 2001 || Socorro || LINEAR || — || align=right | 4.9 km || 
|-id=339 bgcolor=#fefefe
| 99339 ||  || — || December 10, 2001 || Socorro || LINEAR || — || align=right | 2.1 km || 
|-id=340 bgcolor=#fefefe
| 99340 ||  || — || December 10, 2001 || Socorro || LINEAR || — || align=right | 1.7 km || 
|-id=341 bgcolor=#fefefe
| 99341 ||  || — || December 11, 2001 || Socorro || LINEAR || — || align=right | 2.2 km || 
|-id=342 bgcolor=#E9E9E9
| 99342 ||  || — || December 11, 2001 || Socorro || LINEAR || — || align=right | 3.7 km || 
|-id=343 bgcolor=#fefefe
| 99343 ||  || — || December 11, 2001 || Socorro || LINEAR || — || align=right | 2.0 km || 
|-id=344 bgcolor=#fefefe
| 99344 ||  || — || December 10, 2001 || Socorro || LINEAR || — || align=right | 1.4 km || 
|-id=345 bgcolor=#fefefe
| 99345 ||  || — || December 10, 2001 || Socorro || LINEAR || — || align=right | 1.7 km || 
|-id=346 bgcolor=#fefefe
| 99346 ||  || — || December 10, 2001 || Socorro || LINEAR || FLO || align=right | 2.0 km || 
|-id=347 bgcolor=#fefefe
| 99347 ||  || — || December 11, 2001 || Socorro || LINEAR || — || align=right | 1.8 km || 
|-id=348 bgcolor=#fefefe
| 99348 ||  || — || December 11, 2001 || Socorro || LINEAR || — || align=right | 1.6 km || 
|-id=349 bgcolor=#fefefe
| 99349 ||  || — || December 10, 2001 || Socorro || LINEAR || — || align=right | 1.6 km || 
|-id=350 bgcolor=#fefefe
| 99350 ||  || — || December 10, 2001 || Socorro || LINEAR || — || align=right | 2.9 km || 
|-id=351 bgcolor=#fefefe
| 99351 ||  || — || December 13, 2001 || Socorro || LINEAR || — || align=right | 2.4 km || 
|-id=352 bgcolor=#fefefe
| 99352 ||  || — || December 13, 2001 || Socorro || LINEAR || — || align=right | 2.1 km || 
|-id=353 bgcolor=#E9E9E9
| 99353 ||  || — || December 14, 2001 || Socorro || LINEAR || — || align=right | 3.1 km || 
|-id=354 bgcolor=#fefefe
| 99354 ||  || — || December 14, 2001 || Socorro || LINEAR || — || align=right | 1.4 km || 
|-id=355 bgcolor=#fefefe
| 99355 ||  || — || December 14, 2001 || Socorro || LINEAR || — || align=right | 1.2 km || 
|-id=356 bgcolor=#fefefe
| 99356 ||  || — || December 14, 2001 || Socorro || LINEAR || FLO || align=right | 1.6 km || 
|-id=357 bgcolor=#fefefe
| 99357 ||  || — || December 14, 2001 || Socorro || LINEAR || FLO || align=right | 2.0 km || 
|-id=358 bgcolor=#fefefe
| 99358 ||  || — || December 14, 2001 || Socorro || LINEAR || — || align=right | 1.4 km || 
|-id=359 bgcolor=#fefefe
| 99359 ||  || — || December 14, 2001 || Socorro || LINEAR || FLO || align=right | 1.7 km || 
|-id=360 bgcolor=#fefefe
| 99360 ||  || — || December 14, 2001 || Socorro || LINEAR || — || align=right | 1.2 km || 
|-id=361 bgcolor=#fefefe
| 99361 ||  || — || December 14, 2001 || Socorro || LINEAR || V || align=right | 1.3 km || 
|-id=362 bgcolor=#fefefe
| 99362 ||  || — || December 14, 2001 || Socorro || LINEAR || FLO || align=right | 1.8 km || 
|-id=363 bgcolor=#fefefe
| 99363 ||  || — || December 14, 2001 || Socorro || LINEAR || — || align=right | 1.7 km || 
|-id=364 bgcolor=#fefefe
| 99364 ||  || — || December 11, 2001 || Socorro || LINEAR || FLO || align=right | 1.3 km || 
|-id=365 bgcolor=#fefefe
| 99365 ||  || — || December 11, 2001 || Socorro || LINEAR || — || align=right | 3.9 km || 
|-id=366 bgcolor=#fefefe
| 99366 ||  || — || December 11, 2001 || Socorro || LINEAR || V || align=right | 1.6 km || 
|-id=367 bgcolor=#fefefe
| 99367 ||  || — || December 14, 2001 || Socorro || LINEAR || — || align=right | 1.0 km || 
|-id=368 bgcolor=#C2FFFF
| 99368 ||  || — || December 15, 2001 || Socorro || LINEAR || L5 || align=right | 15 km || 
|-id=369 bgcolor=#fefefe
| 99369 ||  || — || December 15, 2001 || Socorro || LINEAR || — || align=right | 1.3 km || 
|-id=370 bgcolor=#fefefe
| 99370 ||  || — || December 15, 2001 || Socorro || LINEAR || V || align=right | 1.4 km || 
|-id=371 bgcolor=#fefefe
| 99371 ||  || — || December 14, 2001 || Socorro || LINEAR || V || align=right | 1.4 km || 
|-id=372 bgcolor=#fefefe
| 99372 ||  || — || December 14, 2001 || Socorro || LINEAR || — || align=right | 1.6 km || 
|-id=373 bgcolor=#fefefe
| 99373 || 2001 YU || — || December 18, 2001 || Kingsnake || J. V. McClusky || — || align=right | 1.9 km || 
|-id=374 bgcolor=#fefefe
| 99374 ||  || — || December 17, 2001 || Socorro || LINEAR || NYS || align=right | 1.4 km || 
|-id=375 bgcolor=#fefefe
| 99375 ||  || — || December 18, 2001 || Socorro || LINEAR || — || align=right | 1.7 km || 
|-id=376 bgcolor=#fefefe
| 99376 ||  || — || December 18, 2001 || Socorro || LINEAR || — || align=right | 1.7 km || 
|-id=377 bgcolor=#fefefe
| 99377 ||  || — || December 18, 2001 || Socorro || LINEAR || — || align=right | 3.6 km || 
|-id=378 bgcolor=#fefefe
| 99378 ||  || — || December 18, 2001 || Socorro || LINEAR || — || align=right | 1.8 km || 
|-id=379 bgcolor=#fefefe
| 99379 ||  || — || December 18, 2001 || Socorro || LINEAR || — || align=right | 3.1 km || 
|-id=380 bgcolor=#fefefe
| 99380 ||  || — || December 18, 2001 || Socorro || LINEAR || V || align=right | 1.8 km || 
|-id=381 bgcolor=#fefefe
| 99381 ||  || — || December 19, 2001 || Kitt Peak || Spacewatch || V || align=right | 1.3 km || 
|-id=382 bgcolor=#fefefe
| 99382 ||  || — || December 18, 2001 || Palomar || NEAT || FLO || align=right | 1.2 km || 
|-id=383 bgcolor=#fefefe
| 99383 ||  || — || December 18, 2001 || Socorro || LINEAR || — || align=right | 3.8 km || 
|-id=384 bgcolor=#fefefe
| 99384 ||  || — || December 19, 2001 || Socorro || LINEAR || PHO || align=right | 3.1 km || 
|-id=385 bgcolor=#E9E9E9
| 99385 ||  || — || December 17, 2001 || Socorro || LINEAR || — || align=right | 3.4 km || 
|-id=386 bgcolor=#d6d6d6
| 99386 ||  || — || December 18, 2001 || Socorro || LINEAR || HYG || align=right | 6.7 km || 
|-id=387 bgcolor=#E9E9E9
| 99387 ||  || — || December 19, 2001 || Palomar || NEAT || INO || align=right | 3.0 km || 
|-id=388 bgcolor=#fefefe
| 99388 || 2002 AL || — || January 4, 2002 || San Marcello || A. Boattini, M. Tombelli || H || align=right | 1.1 km || 
|-id=389 bgcolor=#fefefe
| 99389 || 2002 AN || — || January 5, 2002 || San Marcello || L. Tesi, M. Tombelli || — || align=right | 2.1 km || 
|-id=390 bgcolor=#fefefe
| 99390 ||  || — || January 6, 2002 || Oizumi || T. Kobayashi || — || align=right | 1.8 km || 
|-id=391 bgcolor=#fefefe
| 99391 ||  || — || January 8, 2002 || Socorro || LINEAR || H || align=right | 1.7 km || 
|-id=392 bgcolor=#fefefe
| 99392 ||  || — || January 9, 2002 || Oaxaca || J. M. Roe || — || align=right | 1.5 km || 
|-id=393 bgcolor=#fefefe
| 99393 ||  || — || January 8, 2002 || Socorro || LINEAR || — || align=right | 1.3 km || 
|-id=394 bgcolor=#E9E9E9
| 99394 ||  || — || January 4, 2002 || Haleakala || NEAT || — || align=right | 3.5 km || 
|-id=395 bgcolor=#fefefe
| 99395 ||  || — || January 8, 2002 || Haleakala || NEAT || H || align=right | 1.7 km || 
|-id=396 bgcolor=#fefefe
| 99396 ||  || — || January 5, 2002 || Haleakala || NEAT || — || align=right | 2.5 km || 
|-id=397 bgcolor=#fefefe
| 99397 ||  || — || January 7, 2002 || Haleakala || NEAT || — || align=right | 2.0 km || 
|-id=398 bgcolor=#d6d6d6
| 99398 ||  || — || January 8, 2002 || Socorro || LINEAR || EOS || align=right | 5.1 km || 
|-id=399 bgcolor=#E9E9E9
| 99399 ||  || — || January 9, 2002 || Socorro || LINEAR || — || align=right | 5.6 km || 
|-id=400 bgcolor=#fefefe
| 99400 ||  || — || January 11, 2002 || Palomar || NEAT || — || align=right | 1.6 km || 
|}

99401–99500 

|-bgcolor=#fefefe
| 99401 ||  || — || January 12, 2002 || Haleakala || NEAT || — || align=right | 2.3 km || 
|-id=402 bgcolor=#fefefe
| 99402 ||  || — || January 9, 2002 || Socorro || LINEAR || NYS || align=right | 1.7 km || 
|-id=403 bgcolor=#fefefe
| 99403 ||  || — || January 9, 2002 || Socorro || LINEAR || — || align=right | 1.6 km || 
|-id=404 bgcolor=#fefefe
| 99404 ||  || — || January 11, 2002 || Socorro || LINEAR || — || align=right | 1.1 km || 
|-id=405 bgcolor=#fefefe
| 99405 ||  || — || January 11, 2002 || Socorro || LINEAR || NYS || align=right | 1.8 km || 
|-id=406 bgcolor=#fefefe
| 99406 ||  || — || January 11, 2002 || Socorro || LINEAR || — || align=right | 1.5 km || 
|-id=407 bgcolor=#E9E9E9
| 99407 ||  || — || January 11, 2002 || Socorro || LINEAR || — || align=right | 2.1 km || 
|-id=408 bgcolor=#fefefe
| 99408 ||  || — || January 7, 2002 || Palomar || NEAT || — || align=right | 1.8 km || 
|-id=409 bgcolor=#fefefe
| 99409 ||  || — || January 8, 2002 || Socorro || LINEAR || — || align=right | 1.9 km || 
|-id=410 bgcolor=#fefefe
| 99410 ||  || — || January 8, 2002 || Socorro || LINEAR || FLO || align=right data-sort-value="0.84" | 840 m || 
|-id=411 bgcolor=#fefefe
| 99411 ||  || — || January 9, 2002 || Socorro || LINEAR || — || align=right | 1.6 km || 
|-id=412 bgcolor=#fefefe
| 99412 ||  || — || January 9, 2002 || Socorro || LINEAR || FLO || align=right | 1.3 km || 
|-id=413 bgcolor=#fefefe
| 99413 ||  || — || January 9, 2002 || Socorro || LINEAR || — || align=right | 1.6 km || 
|-id=414 bgcolor=#fefefe
| 99414 ||  || — || January 9, 2002 || Socorro || LINEAR || MAS || align=right | 1.2 km || 
|-id=415 bgcolor=#fefefe
| 99415 ||  || — || January 9, 2002 || Socorro || LINEAR || — || align=right | 2.0 km || 
|-id=416 bgcolor=#E9E9E9
| 99416 ||  || — || January 14, 2002 || Desert Eagle || W. K. Y. Yeung || — || align=right | 3.6 km || 
|-id=417 bgcolor=#d6d6d6
| 99417 ||  || — || January 13, 2002 || Socorro || LINEAR || — || align=right | 6.5 km || 
|-id=418 bgcolor=#d6d6d6
| 99418 ||  || — || January 14, 2002 || Socorro || LINEAR || — || align=right | 7.4 km || 
|-id=419 bgcolor=#fefefe
| 99419 ||  || — || January 14, 2002 || Socorro || LINEAR || NYS || align=right | 1.7 km || 
|-id=420 bgcolor=#E9E9E9
| 99420 ||  || — || January 13, 2002 || Socorro || LINEAR || — || align=right | 2.9 km || 
|-id=421 bgcolor=#fefefe
| 99421 ||  || — || January 13, 2002 || Socorro || LINEAR || FLO || align=right | 1.3 km || 
|-id=422 bgcolor=#fefefe
| 99422 ||  || — || January 14, 2002 || Socorro || LINEAR || NYS || align=right | 2.4 km || 
|-id=423 bgcolor=#fefefe
| 99423 ||  || — || January 14, 2002 || Socorro || LINEAR || — || align=right | 1.8 km || 
|-id=424 bgcolor=#fefefe
| 99424 ||  || — || January 8, 2002 || Socorro || LINEAR || FLO || align=right | 2.6 km || 
|-id=425 bgcolor=#fefefe
| 99425 ||  || — || January 11, 2002 || Kitt Peak || Spacewatch || — || align=right | 1.3 km || 
|-id=426 bgcolor=#fefefe
| 99426 ||  || — || January 11, 2002 || Socorro || LINEAR || — || align=right | 1.8 km || 
|-id=427 bgcolor=#E9E9E9
| 99427 ||  || — || January 11, 2002 || Socorro || LINEAR || — || align=right | 2.5 km || 
|-id=428 bgcolor=#fefefe
| 99428 ||  || — || January 12, 2002 || Haleakala || NEAT || — || align=right | 2.0 km || 
|-id=429 bgcolor=#fefefe
| 99429 ||  || — || January 14, 2002 || Kitt Peak || Spacewatch || NYS || align=right | 1.2 km || 
|-id=430 bgcolor=#fefefe
| 99430 ||  || — || January 19, 2002 || Desert Eagle || W. K. Y. Yeung || FLO || align=right | 1.6 km || 
|-id=431 bgcolor=#d6d6d6
| 99431 ||  || — || January 18, 2002 || Socorro || LINEAR || — || align=right | 4.1 km || 
|-id=432 bgcolor=#fefefe
| 99432 ||  || — || January 19, 2002 || Socorro || LINEAR || — || align=right | 1.6 km || 
|-id=433 bgcolor=#fefefe
| 99433 ||  || — || January 19, 2002 || Socorro || LINEAR || NYS || align=right | 1.4 km || 
|-id=434 bgcolor=#fefefe
| 99434 ||  || — || January 19, 2002 || Socorro || LINEAR || — || align=right | 1.7 km || 
|-id=435 bgcolor=#d6d6d6
| 99435 ||  || — || January 21, 2002 || Socorro || LINEAR || KOR || align=right | 3.8 km || 
|-id=436 bgcolor=#fefefe
| 99436 ||  || — || January 22, 2002 || Socorro || LINEAR || MAS || align=right | 1.8 km || 
|-id=437 bgcolor=#fefefe
| 99437 ||  || — || January 25, 2002 || Palomar || NEAT || V || align=right | 1.4 km || 
|-id=438 bgcolor=#E9E9E9
| 99438 ||  || — || January 25, 2002 || Palomar || NEAT || — || align=right | 2.1 km || 
|-id=439 bgcolor=#fefefe
| 99439 ||  || — || February 2, 2002 || Cima Ekar || ADAS || FLO || align=right | 1.2 km || 
|-id=440 bgcolor=#fefefe
| 99440 ||  || — || February 3, 2002 || Palomar || NEAT || FLO || align=right | 1.4 km || 
|-id=441 bgcolor=#fefefe
| 99441 ||  || — || February 4, 2002 || Haleakala || NEAT || NYS || align=right | 1.7 km || 
|-id=442 bgcolor=#fefefe
| 99442 ||  || — || February 4, 2002 || Palomar || NEAT || V || align=right | 2.0 km || 
|-id=443 bgcolor=#fefefe
| 99443 ||  || — || February 8, 2002 || Desert Eagle || W. K. Y. Yeung || NYS || align=right | 1.8 km || 
|-id=444 bgcolor=#fefefe
| 99444 ||  || — || February 6, 2002 || Socorro || LINEAR || V || align=right | 1.4 km || 
|-id=445 bgcolor=#fefefe
| 99445 ||  || — || February 5, 2002 || Palomar || NEAT || — || align=right | 1.4 km || 
|-id=446 bgcolor=#fefefe
| 99446 ||  || — || February 6, 2002 || Haleakala || NEAT || V || align=right | 1.3 km || 
|-id=447 bgcolor=#fefefe
| 99447 ||  || — || February 10, 2002 || Fountain Hills || C. W. Juels, P. R. Holvorcem || PHO || align=right | 3.2 km || 
|-id=448 bgcolor=#fefefe
| 99448 ||  || — || February 6, 2002 || Socorro || LINEAR || FLO || align=right | 1.5 km || 
|-id=449 bgcolor=#fefefe
| 99449 ||  || — || February 6, 2002 || Socorro || LINEAR || — || align=right | 3.6 km || 
|-id=450 bgcolor=#E9E9E9
| 99450 ||  || — || February 6, 2002 || Socorro || LINEAR || ADE || align=right | 4.2 km || 
|-id=451 bgcolor=#E9E9E9
| 99451 ||  || — || February 7, 2002 || Socorro || LINEAR || — || align=right | 3.7 km || 
|-id=452 bgcolor=#E9E9E9
| 99452 ||  || — || February 7, 2002 || Socorro || LINEAR || — || align=right | 2.4 km || 
|-id=453 bgcolor=#fefefe
| 99453 ||  || — || February 12, 2002 || Fountain Hills || C. W. Juels, P. R. Holvorcem || — || align=right | 1.4 km || 
|-id=454 bgcolor=#fefefe
| 99454 ||  || — || February 12, 2002 || Fountain Hills || C. W. Juels, P. R. Holvorcem || — || align=right | 1.5 km || 
|-id=455 bgcolor=#E9E9E9
| 99455 ||  || — || February 7, 2002 || Socorro || LINEAR || — || align=right | 1.6 km || 
|-id=456 bgcolor=#fefefe
| 99456 ||  || — || February 7, 2002 || Socorro || LINEAR || — || align=right | 3.1 km || 
|-id=457 bgcolor=#fefefe
| 99457 ||  || — || February 13, 2002 || Nashville || R. Clingan || — || align=right | 3.3 km || 
|-id=458 bgcolor=#fefefe
| 99458 ||  || — || February 12, 2002 || Desert Eagle || W. K. Y. Yeung || EUT || align=right | 1.2 km || 
|-id=459 bgcolor=#d6d6d6
| 99459 ||  || — || February 6, 2002 || Socorro || LINEAR || — || align=right | 4.8 km || 
|-id=460 bgcolor=#E9E9E9
| 99460 ||  || — || February 7, 2002 || Socorro || LINEAR || — || align=right | 3.5 km || 
|-id=461 bgcolor=#fefefe
| 99461 ||  || — || February 7, 2002 || Socorro || LINEAR || — || align=right | 2.1 km || 
|-id=462 bgcolor=#fefefe
| 99462 ||  || — || February 7, 2002 || Socorro || LINEAR || — || align=right | 1.5 km || 
|-id=463 bgcolor=#fefefe
| 99463 ||  || — || February 7, 2002 || Socorro || LINEAR || — || align=right | 2.4 km || 
|-id=464 bgcolor=#C2FFFF
| 99464 ||  || — || February 7, 2002 || Socorro || LINEAR || L4 || align=right | 13 km || 
|-id=465 bgcolor=#fefefe
| 99465 ||  || — || February 7, 2002 || Socorro || LINEAR || MAS || align=right | 1.5 km || 
|-id=466 bgcolor=#d6d6d6
| 99466 ||  || — || February 7, 2002 || Socorro || LINEAR || ALA || align=right | 6.1 km || 
|-id=467 bgcolor=#fefefe
| 99467 ||  || — || February 7, 2002 || Socorro || LINEAR || MAS || align=right | 1.9 km || 
|-id=468 bgcolor=#E9E9E9
| 99468 ||  || — || February 7, 2002 || Socorro || LINEAR || — || align=right | 3.3 km || 
|-id=469 bgcolor=#fefefe
| 99469 ||  || — || February 7, 2002 || Socorro || LINEAR || NYS || align=right | 1.3 km || 
|-id=470 bgcolor=#fefefe
| 99470 ||  || — || February 7, 2002 || Socorro || LINEAR || FLO || align=right | 1.1 km || 
|-id=471 bgcolor=#d6d6d6
| 99471 ||  || — || February 7, 2002 || Socorro || LINEAR || — || align=right | 8.7 km || 
|-id=472 bgcolor=#fefefe
| 99472 ||  || — || February 7, 2002 || Socorro || LINEAR || — || align=right | 1.8 km || 
|-id=473 bgcolor=#fefefe
| 99473 ||  || — || February 7, 2002 || Socorro || LINEAR || — || align=right | 2.0 km || 
|-id=474 bgcolor=#fefefe
| 99474 ||  || — || February 8, 2002 || Socorro || LINEAR || — || align=right | 1.4 km || 
|-id=475 bgcolor=#fefefe
| 99475 ||  || — || February 13, 2002 || Socorro || LINEAR || PHO || align=right | 3.4 km || 
|-id=476 bgcolor=#E9E9E9
| 99476 ||  || — || February 7, 2002 || Socorro || LINEAR || — || align=right | 2.2 km || 
|-id=477 bgcolor=#fefefe
| 99477 ||  || — || February 8, 2002 || Socorro || LINEAR || V || align=right | 1.5 km || 
|-id=478 bgcolor=#fefefe
| 99478 ||  || — || February 8, 2002 || Socorro || LINEAR || FLO || align=right | 1.4 km || 
|-id=479 bgcolor=#fefefe
| 99479 ||  || — || February 10, 2002 || Socorro || LINEAR || — || align=right | 1.3 km || 
|-id=480 bgcolor=#fefefe
| 99480 ||  || — || February 9, 2002 || Kitt Peak || Spacewatch || — || align=right | 1.4 km || 
|-id=481 bgcolor=#fefefe
| 99481 ||  || — || February 7, 2002 || Socorro || LINEAR || NYS || align=right | 2.6 km || 
|-id=482 bgcolor=#fefefe
| 99482 ||  || — || February 7, 2002 || Socorro || LINEAR || NYS || align=right | 3.3 km || 
|-id=483 bgcolor=#E9E9E9
| 99483 ||  || — || February 8, 2002 || Socorro || LINEAR || — || align=right | 4.6 km || 
|-id=484 bgcolor=#fefefe
| 99484 ||  || — || February 8, 2002 || Socorro || LINEAR || — || align=right | 2.1 km || 
|-id=485 bgcolor=#fefefe
| 99485 ||  || — || February 8, 2002 || Socorro || LINEAR || — || align=right | 1.9 km || 
|-id=486 bgcolor=#fefefe
| 99486 ||  || — || February 8, 2002 || Socorro || LINEAR || FLO || align=right | 1.4 km || 
|-id=487 bgcolor=#fefefe
| 99487 ||  || — || February 8, 2002 || Socorro || LINEAR || FLO || align=right | 1.6 km || 
|-id=488 bgcolor=#fefefe
| 99488 ||  || — || February 8, 2002 || Socorro || LINEAR || — || align=right | 1.7 km || 
|-id=489 bgcolor=#E9E9E9
| 99489 ||  || — || February 8, 2002 || Socorro || LINEAR || — || align=right | 6.6 km || 
|-id=490 bgcolor=#fefefe
| 99490 ||  || — || February 10, 2002 || Socorro || LINEAR || — || align=right | 1.9 km || 
|-id=491 bgcolor=#fefefe
| 99491 ||  || — || February 6, 2002 || Palomar || NEAT || — || align=right | 2.1 km || 
|-id=492 bgcolor=#E9E9E9
| 99492 ||  || — || February 7, 2002 || Socorro || LINEAR || — || align=right | 2.0 km || 
|-id=493 bgcolor=#E9E9E9
| 99493 ||  || — || February 10, 2002 || Socorro || LINEAR || GEF || align=right | 3.4 km || 
|-id=494 bgcolor=#E9E9E9
| 99494 ||  || — || February 11, 2002 || Socorro || LINEAR || — || align=right | 4.2 km || 
|-id=495 bgcolor=#fefefe
| 99495 ||  || — || February 11, 2002 || Socorro || LINEAR || — || align=right | 1.5 km || 
|-id=496 bgcolor=#E9E9E9
| 99496 ||  || — || February 11, 2002 || Socorro || LINEAR || — || align=right | 2.0 km || 
|-id=497 bgcolor=#fefefe
| 99497 ||  || — || February 11, 2002 || Socorro || LINEAR || — || align=right | 1.8 km || 
|-id=498 bgcolor=#fefefe
| 99498 ||  || — || February 14, 2002 || Socorro || LINEAR || PHO || align=right | 2.4 km || 
|-id=499 bgcolor=#fefefe
| 99499 ||  || — || February 15, 2002 || Socorro || LINEAR || NYS || align=right data-sort-value="0.96" | 960 m || 
|-id=500 bgcolor=#fefefe
| 99500 ||  || — || February 14, 2002 || Palomar || NEAT || FLO || align=right | 1.3 km || 
|}

99501–99600 

|-bgcolor=#E9E9E9
| 99501 ||  || — || February 8, 2002 || Socorro || LINEAR || — || align=right | 2.6 km || 
|-id=502 bgcolor=#fefefe
| 99502 ||  || — || February 11, 2002 || Haleakala || NEAT || V || align=right | 1.3 km || 
|-id=503 bgcolor=#fefefe
| 99503 Leewonchul ||  ||  || February 16, 2002 || Bohyunsan || Y.-B. Jeon || — || align=right | 4.1 km || 
|-id=504 bgcolor=#fefefe
| 99504 ||  || — || February 22, 2002 || Palomar || NEAT || FLO || align=right | 1.8 km || 
|-id=505 bgcolor=#fefefe
| 99505 ||  || — || February 16, 2002 || Haleakala || NEAT || — || align=right | 1.9 km || 
|-id=506 bgcolor=#d6d6d6
| 99506 ||  || — || February 20, 2002 || Anderson Mesa || LONEOS || — || align=right | 9.0 km || 
|-id=507 bgcolor=#fefefe
| 99507 ||  || — || March 6, 2002 || Ondřejov || P. Kušnirák || FLO || align=right data-sort-value="0.94" | 940 m || 
|-id=508 bgcolor=#fefefe
| 99508 ||  || — || March 9, 2002 || Kvistaberg || UDAS || — || align=right | 1.4 km || 
|-id=509 bgcolor=#fefefe
| 99509 ||  || — || March 14, 2002 || Kvistaberg || UDAS || — || align=right | 1.9 km || 
|-id=510 bgcolor=#fefefe
| 99510 ||  || — || March 14, 2002 || Desert Eagle || W. K. Y. Yeung || — || align=right | 2.2 km || 
|-id=511 bgcolor=#fefefe
| 99511 ||  || — || March 5, 2002 || Kitt Peak || Spacewatch || — || align=right | 1.1 km || 
|-id=512 bgcolor=#fefefe
| 99512 ||  || — || March 9, 2002 || Socorro || LINEAR || — || align=right | 1.4 km || 
|-id=513 bgcolor=#fefefe
| 99513 ||  || — || March 10, 2002 || Anderson Mesa || LONEOS || NYS || align=right | 1.6 km || 
|-id=514 bgcolor=#fefefe
| 99514 ||  || — || March 10, 2002 || Anderson Mesa || LONEOS || — || align=right | 1.7 km || 
|-id=515 bgcolor=#fefefe
| 99515 ||  || — || March 9, 2002 || Socorro || LINEAR || FLO || align=right | 1.6 km || 
|-id=516 bgcolor=#fefefe
| 99516 ||  || — || March 9, 2002 || Socorro || LINEAR || V || align=right | 1.4 km || 
|-id=517 bgcolor=#fefefe
| 99517 ||  || — || March 9, 2002 || Socorro || LINEAR || NYS || align=right | 1.6 km || 
|-id=518 bgcolor=#fefefe
| 99518 ||  || — || March 9, 2002 || Socorro || LINEAR || — || align=right | 2.1 km || 
|-id=519 bgcolor=#fefefe
| 99519 ||  || — || March 10, 2002 || Socorro || LINEAR || NYS || align=right | 5.0 km || 
|-id=520 bgcolor=#fefefe
| 99520 ||  || — || March 11, 2002 || Palomar || NEAT || V || align=right | 1.4 km || 
|-id=521 bgcolor=#E9E9E9
| 99521 ||  || — || March 11, 2002 || Palomar || NEAT || EUN || align=right | 2.5 km || 
|-id=522 bgcolor=#fefefe
| 99522 ||  || — || March 11, 2002 || Socorro || LINEAR || V || align=right | 1.8 km || 
|-id=523 bgcolor=#d6d6d6
| 99523 ||  || — || March 13, 2002 || Socorro || LINEAR || — || align=right | 6.0 km || 
|-id=524 bgcolor=#fefefe
| 99524 ||  || — || March 13, 2002 || Socorro || LINEAR || — || align=right | 1.7 km || 
|-id=525 bgcolor=#fefefe
| 99525 ||  || — || March 13, 2002 || Socorro || LINEAR || FLO || align=right | 1.4 km || 
|-id=526 bgcolor=#fefefe
| 99526 ||  || — || March 13, 2002 || Socorro || LINEAR || FLO || align=right | 1.3 km || 
|-id=527 bgcolor=#fefefe
| 99527 ||  || — || March 13, 2002 || Socorro || LINEAR || — || align=right | 2.6 km || 
|-id=528 bgcolor=#d6d6d6
| 99528 ||  || — || March 15, 2002 || Kitt Peak || Spacewatch || FIR || align=right | 7.2 km || 
|-id=529 bgcolor=#E9E9E9
| 99529 ||  || — || March 9, 2002 || Socorro || LINEAR || — || align=right | 2.0 km || 
|-id=530 bgcolor=#fefefe
| 99530 ||  || — || March 9, 2002 || Socorro || LINEAR || FLO || align=right | 1.5 km || 
|-id=531 bgcolor=#fefefe
| 99531 ||  || — || March 9, 2002 || Socorro || LINEAR || — || align=right | 1.9 km || 
|-id=532 bgcolor=#d6d6d6
| 99532 ||  || — || March 9, 2002 || Socorro || LINEAR || — || align=right | 5.6 km || 
|-id=533 bgcolor=#fefefe
| 99533 ||  || — || March 9, 2002 || Socorro || LINEAR || — || align=right | 2.0 km || 
|-id=534 bgcolor=#fefefe
| 99534 ||  || — || March 12, 2002 || Socorro || LINEAR || — || align=right | 1.5 km || 
|-id=535 bgcolor=#fefefe
| 99535 ||  || — || March 12, 2002 || Socorro || LINEAR || — || align=right | 1.8 km || 
|-id=536 bgcolor=#fefefe
| 99536 ||  || — || March 13, 2002 || Socorro || LINEAR || — || align=right | 2.0 km || 
|-id=537 bgcolor=#fefefe
| 99537 ||  || — || March 11, 2002 || Socorro || LINEAR || — || align=right | 1.6 km || 
|-id=538 bgcolor=#E9E9E9
| 99538 ||  || — || March 12, 2002 || Socorro || LINEAR || — || align=right | 2.2 km || 
|-id=539 bgcolor=#fefefe
| 99539 ||  || — || March 12, 2002 || Socorro || LINEAR || — || align=right | 1.4 km || 
|-id=540 bgcolor=#fefefe
| 99540 ||  || — || March 12, 2002 || Socorro || LINEAR || FLO || align=right | 3.1 km || 
|-id=541 bgcolor=#fefefe
| 99541 ||  || — || March 13, 2002 || Socorro || LINEAR || — || align=right | 1.9 km || 
|-id=542 bgcolor=#fefefe
| 99542 ||  || — || March 15, 2002 || Socorro || LINEAR || FLO || align=right | 1.3 km || 
|-id=543 bgcolor=#fefefe
| 99543 ||  || — || March 2, 2002 || Palomar || NEAT || — || align=right | 1.7 km || 
|-id=544 bgcolor=#fefefe
| 99544 ||  || — || March 5, 2002 || Anderson Mesa || LONEOS || V || align=right | 1.6 km || 
|-id=545 bgcolor=#E9E9E9
| 99545 ||  || — || March 9, 2002 || Anderson Mesa || LONEOS || — || align=right | 2.2 km || 
|-id=546 bgcolor=#E9E9E9
| 99546 ||  || — || March 9, 2002 || Anderson Mesa || LONEOS || — || align=right | 3.4 km || 
|-id=547 bgcolor=#fefefe
| 99547 ||  || — || March 9, 2002 || Anderson Mesa || LONEOS || — || align=right | 1.4 km || 
|-id=548 bgcolor=#E9E9E9
| 99548 ||  || — || March 10, 2002 || Haleakala || NEAT || — || align=right | 3.2 km || 
|-id=549 bgcolor=#E9E9E9
| 99549 ||  || — || March 10, 2002 || Palomar || NEAT || — || align=right | 3.5 km || 
|-id=550 bgcolor=#fefefe
| 99550 ||  || — || March 12, 2002 || Socorro || LINEAR || — || align=right | 1.7 km || 
|-id=551 bgcolor=#E9E9E9
| 99551 ||  || — || March 13, 2002 || Socorro || LINEAR || — || align=right | 1.8 km || 
|-id=552 bgcolor=#fefefe
| 99552 ||  || — || March 13, 2002 || Palomar || NEAT || FLO || align=right | 1.2 km || 
|-id=553 bgcolor=#E9E9E9
| 99553 ||  || — || March 12, 2002 || Palomar || NEAT || — || align=right | 5.0 km || 
|-id=554 bgcolor=#E9E9E9
| 99554 ||  || — || March 13, 2002 || Socorro || LINEAR || — || align=right | 2.3 km || 
|-id=555 bgcolor=#fefefe
| 99555 ||  || — || March 13, 2002 || Socorro || LINEAR || — || align=right | 2.1 km || 
|-id=556 bgcolor=#E9E9E9
| 99556 ||  || — || March 13, 2002 || Palomar || NEAT || — || align=right | 1.8 km || 
|-id=557 bgcolor=#E9E9E9
| 99557 ||  || — || March 14, 2002 || Socorro || LINEAR || — || align=right | 3.8 km || 
|-id=558 bgcolor=#E9E9E9
| 99558 ||  || — || March 14, 2002 || Palomar || NEAT || — || align=right | 2.5 km || 
|-id=559 bgcolor=#fefefe
| 99559 ||  || — || March 19, 2002 || Fountain Hills || Fountain Hills Obs. || PHO || align=right | 2.3 km || 
|-id=560 bgcolor=#E9E9E9
| 99560 ||  || — || March 19, 2002 || Desert Eagle || W. K. Y. Yeung || — || align=right | 3.0 km || 
|-id=561 bgcolor=#fefefe
| 99561 ||  || — || March 20, 2002 || Desert Eagle || W. K. Y. Yeung || FLO || align=right | 1.5 km || 
|-id=562 bgcolor=#fefefe
| 99562 ||  || — || March 16, 2002 || Farpoint || G. Hug || — || align=right | 1.6 km || 
|-id=563 bgcolor=#E9E9E9
| 99563 ||  || — || March 16, 2002 || Socorro || LINEAR || — || align=right | 2.2 km || 
|-id=564 bgcolor=#fefefe
| 99564 ||  || — || March 16, 2002 || Socorro || LINEAR || V || align=right | 2.2 km || 
|-id=565 bgcolor=#fefefe
| 99565 ||  || — || March 16, 2002 || Socorro || LINEAR || PHO || align=right | 3.1 km || 
|-id=566 bgcolor=#fefefe
| 99566 ||  || — || March 16, 2002 || Haleakala || NEAT || FLO || align=right | 1.3 km || 
|-id=567 bgcolor=#E9E9E9
| 99567 ||  || — || March 16, 2002 || Socorro || LINEAR || — || align=right | 1.6 km || 
|-id=568 bgcolor=#fefefe
| 99568 ||  || — || March 16, 2002 || Socorro || LINEAR || NYS || align=right | 6.2 km || 
|-id=569 bgcolor=#fefefe
| 99569 ||  || — || March 16, 2002 || Socorro || LINEAR || — || align=right | 1.5 km || 
|-id=570 bgcolor=#E9E9E9
| 99570 ||  || — || March 16, 2002 || Socorro || LINEAR || — || align=right | 2.0 km || 
|-id=571 bgcolor=#E9E9E9
| 99571 ||  || — || March 16, 2002 || Haleakala || NEAT || — || align=right | 2.2 km || 
|-id=572 bgcolor=#fefefe
| 99572 ||  || — || March 16, 2002 || Haleakala || NEAT || — || align=right | 1.7 km || 
|-id=573 bgcolor=#E9E9E9
| 99573 ||  || — || March 19, 2002 || Socorro || LINEAR || — || align=right | 3.7 km || 
|-id=574 bgcolor=#E9E9E9
| 99574 ||  || — || March 19, 2002 || Socorro || LINEAR || — || align=right | 3.2 km || 
|-id=575 bgcolor=#E9E9E9
| 99575 ||  || — || March 19, 2002 || Palomar || NEAT || — || align=right | 3.9 km || 
|-id=576 bgcolor=#E9E9E9
| 99576 ||  || — || March 19, 2002 || Palomar || NEAT || MAR || align=right | 2.4 km || 
|-id=577 bgcolor=#E9E9E9
| 99577 ||  || — || March 20, 2002 || Socorro || LINEAR || — || align=right | 5.5 km || 
|-id=578 bgcolor=#fefefe
| 99578 ||  || — || March 20, 2002 || Socorro || LINEAR || V || align=right | 1.5 km || 
|-id=579 bgcolor=#fefefe
| 99579 ||  || — || March 20, 2002 || Anderson Mesa || LONEOS || — || align=right | 2.2 km || 
|-id=580 bgcolor=#fefefe
| 99580 ||  || — || March 21, 2002 || Anderson Mesa || LONEOS || — || align=right | 1.6 km || 
|-id=581 bgcolor=#d6d6d6
| 99581 Egal ||  ||  || March 21, 2002 || Anderson Mesa || LONEOS || EUP || align=right | 7.7 km || 
|-id=582 bgcolor=#E9E9E9
| 99582 ||  || — || March 31, 2002 || Palomar || NEAT || — || align=right | 3.3 km || 
|-id=583 bgcolor=#fefefe
| 99583 ||  || — || April 7, 2002 || Essen || Walter Hohmann Obs. || — || align=right | 3.8 km || 
|-id=584 bgcolor=#fefefe
| 99584 ||  || — || April 14, 2002 || Desert Eagle || W. K. Y. Yeung || FLO || align=right | 1.4 km || 
|-id=585 bgcolor=#fefefe
| 99585 ||  || — || April 14, 2002 || Desert Eagle || W. K. Y. Yeung || V || align=right | 1.6 km || 
|-id=586 bgcolor=#E9E9E9
| 99586 ||  || — || April 15, 2002 || Desert Eagle || W. K. Y. Yeung || — || align=right | 4.8 km || 
|-id=587 bgcolor=#fefefe
| 99587 ||  || — || April 15, 2002 || Socorro || LINEAR || — || align=right | 2.1 km || 
|-id=588 bgcolor=#d6d6d6
| 99588 ||  || — || April 15, 2002 || Socorro || LINEAR || — || align=right | 5.3 km || 
|-id=589 bgcolor=#fefefe
| 99589 ||  || — || April 14, 2002 || Socorro || LINEAR || — || align=right | 1.7 km || 
|-id=590 bgcolor=#fefefe
| 99590 ||  || — || April 14, 2002 || Socorro || LINEAR || NYS || align=right | 1.6 km || 
|-id=591 bgcolor=#d6d6d6
| 99591 ||  || — || April 14, 2002 || Socorro || LINEAR || — || align=right | 5.0 km || 
|-id=592 bgcolor=#fefefe
| 99592 ||  || — || April 14, 2002 || Socorro || LINEAR || — || align=right | 1.8 km || 
|-id=593 bgcolor=#E9E9E9
| 99593 ||  || — || April 14, 2002 || Socorro || LINEAR || — || align=right | 1.8 km || 
|-id=594 bgcolor=#fefefe
| 99594 ||  || — || April 15, 2002 || Palomar || NEAT || FLO || align=right | 1.4 km || 
|-id=595 bgcolor=#fefefe
| 99595 ||  || — || April 15, 2002 || Palomar || NEAT || MAS || align=right | 1.4 km || 
|-id=596 bgcolor=#fefefe
| 99596 ||  || — || April 14, 2002 || Ametlla de Mar || J. Nomen || NYS || align=right | 1.5 km || 
|-id=597 bgcolor=#fefefe
| 99597 ||  || — || April 14, 2002 || Socorro || LINEAR || — || align=right | 1.3 km || 
|-id=598 bgcolor=#fefefe
| 99598 ||  || — || April 2, 2002 || Palomar || NEAT || — || align=right | 1.4 km || 
|-id=599 bgcolor=#fefefe
| 99599 ||  || — || April 4, 2002 || Palomar || NEAT || — || align=right | 1.3 km || 
|-id=600 bgcolor=#d6d6d6
| 99600 ||  || — || April 4, 2002 || Palomar || NEAT || THM || align=right | 5.2 km || 
|}

99601–99700 

|-bgcolor=#fefefe
| 99601 ||  || — || April 4, 2002 || Palomar || NEAT || V || align=right | 1.4 km || 
|-id=602 bgcolor=#fefefe
| 99602 ||  || — || April 2, 2002 || Palomar || NEAT || V || align=right | 1.5 km || 
|-id=603 bgcolor=#d6d6d6
| 99603 ||  || — || April 2, 2002 || Palomar || NEAT || — || align=right | 7.0 km || 
|-id=604 bgcolor=#fefefe
| 99604 ||  || — || April 5, 2002 || Palomar || NEAT || — || align=right | 3.7 km || 
|-id=605 bgcolor=#fefefe
| 99605 ||  || — || April 5, 2002 || Palomar || NEAT || NYS || align=right | 1.2 km || 
|-id=606 bgcolor=#fefefe
| 99606 ||  || — || April 5, 2002 || Anderson Mesa || LONEOS || — || align=right | 1.8 km || 
|-id=607 bgcolor=#fefefe
| 99607 ||  || — || April 5, 2002 || Palomar || NEAT || — || align=right | 2.3 km || 
|-id=608 bgcolor=#E9E9E9
| 99608 ||  || — || April 5, 2002 || Palomar || NEAT || — || align=right | 5.3 km || 
|-id=609 bgcolor=#E9E9E9
| 99609 ||  || — || April 8, 2002 || Palomar || NEAT || — || align=right | 4.0 km || 
|-id=610 bgcolor=#E9E9E9
| 99610 ||  || — || April 8, 2002 || Palomar || NEAT || — || align=right | 2.8 km || 
|-id=611 bgcolor=#d6d6d6
| 99611 ||  || — || April 8, 2002 || Socorro || LINEAR || NAE || align=right | 6.1 km || 
|-id=612 bgcolor=#E9E9E9
| 99612 ||  || — || April 9, 2002 || Anderson Mesa || LONEOS || — || align=right | 2.2 km || 
|-id=613 bgcolor=#E9E9E9
| 99613 ||  || — || April 9, 2002 || Anderson Mesa || LONEOS || — || align=right | 4.5 km || 
|-id=614 bgcolor=#d6d6d6
| 99614 ||  || — || April 9, 2002 || Anderson Mesa || LONEOS || — || align=right | 6.5 km || 
|-id=615 bgcolor=#fefefe
| 99615 ||  || — || April 9, 2002 || Anderson Mesa || LONEOS || — || align=right | 1.5 km || 
|-id=616 bgcolor=#fefefe
| 99616 ||  || — || April 10, 2002 || Socorro || LINEAR || — || align=right | 2.0 km || 
|-id=617 bgcolor=#d6d6d6
| 99617 ||  || — || April 10, 2002 || Socorro || LINEAR || — || align=right | 6.4 km || 
|-id=618 bgcolor=#E9E9E9
| 99618 ||  || — || April 10, 2002 || Socorro || LINEAR || — || align=right | 4.7 km || 
|-id=619 bgcolor=#fefefe
| 99619 ||  || — || April 10, 2002 || Socorro || LINEAR || — || align=right | 1.8 km || 
|-id=620 bgcolor=#fefefe
| 99620 ||  || — || April 10, 2002 || Socorro || LINEAR || — || align=right | 2.0 km || 
|-id=621 bgcolor=#fefefe
| 99621 ||  || — || April 10, 2002 || Socorro || LINEAR || V || align=right | 1.3 km || 
|-id=622 bgcolor=#E9E9E9
| 99622 ||  || — || April 10, 2002 || Socorro || LINEAR || — || align=right | 2.4 km || 
|-id=623 bgcolor=#E9E9E9
| 99623 ||  || — || April 10, 2002 || Socorro || LINEAR || — || align=right | 4.9 km || 
|-id=624 bgcolor=#fefefe
| 99624 ||  || — || April 10, 2002 || Socorro || LINEAR || V || align=right | 1.4 km || 
|-id=625 bgcolor=#fefefe
| 99625 ||  || — || April 9, 2002 || Kitt Peak || Spacewatch || — || align=right | 2.3 km || 
|-id=626 bgcolor=#fefefe
| 99626 ||  || — || April 9, 2002 || Anderson Mesa || LONEOS || — || align=right | 1.9 km || 
|-id=627 bgcolor=#d6d6d6
| 99627 ||  || — || April 9, 2002 || Socorro || LINEAR || — || align=right | 3.8 km || 
|-id=628 bgcolor=#E9E9E9
| 99628 ||  || — || April 9, 2002 || Socorro || LINEAR || — || align=right | 1.6 km || 
|-id=629 bgcolor=#fefefe
| 99629 ||  || — || April 9, 2002 || Socorro || LINEAR || — || align=right | 1.4 km || 
|-id=630 bgcolor=#fefefe
| 99630 ||  || — || April 10, 2002 || Socorro || LINEAR || — || align=right | 1.2 km || 
|-id=631 bgcolor=#E9E9E9
| 99631 ||  || — || April 10, 2002 || Socorro || LINEAR || — || align=right | 5.6 km || 
|-id=632 bgcolor=#fefefe
| 99632 ||  || — || April 10, 2002 || Socorro || LINEAR || — || align=right | 1.7 km || 
|-id=633 bgcolor=#E9E9E9
| 99633 ||  || — || April 10, 2002 || Socorro || LINEAR || EUN || align=right | 2.5 km || 
|-id=634 bgcolor=#fefefe
| 99634 ||  || — || April 11, 2002 || Anderson Mesa || LONEOS || V || align=right | 1.2 km || 
|-id=635 bgcolor=#d6d6d6
| 99635 ||  || — || April 11, 2002 || Anderson Mesa || LONEOS || — || align=right | 7.2 km || 
|-id=636 bgcolor=#fefefe
| 99636 ||  || — || April 11, 2002 || Socorro || LINEAR || V || align=right | 1.5 km || 
|-id=637 bgcolor=#fefefe
| 99637 ||  || — || April 11, 2002 || Socorro || LINEAR || V || align=right | 1.8 km || 
|-id=638 bgcolor=#E9E9E9
| 99638 ||  || — || April 11, 2002 || Palomar || NEAT || — || align=right | 2.8 km || 
|-id=639 bgcolor=#d6d6d6
| 99639 ||  || — || April 12, 2002 || Socorro || LINEAR || THM || align=right | 5.8 km || 
|-id=640 bgcolor=#E9E9E9
| 99640 ||  || — || April 13, 2002 || Palomar || NEAT || DOR || align=right | 4.6 km || 
|-id=641 bgcolor=#fefefe
| 99641 ||  || — || April 13, 2002 || Palomar || NEAT || — || align=right | 3.4 km || 
|-id=642 bgcolor=#fefefe
| 99642 ||  || — || April 14, 2002 || Palomar || NEAT || — || align=right | 1.4 km || 
|-id=643 bgcolor=#fefefe
| 99643 ||  || — || April 13, 2002 || Palomar || NEAT || V || align=right | 1.2 km || 
|-id=644 bgcolor=#d6d6d6
| 99644 ||  || — || April 14, 2002 || Socorro || LINEAR || — || align=right | 4.3 km || 
|-id=645 bgcolor=#E9E9E9
| 99645 ||  || — || April 14, 2002 || Palomar || NEAT || — || align=right | 2.4 km || 
|-id=646 bgcolor=#E9E9E9
| 99646 ||  || — || April 9, 2002 || Socorro || LINEAR || — || align=right | 1.7 km || 
|-id=647 bgcolor=#E9E9E9
| 99647 ||  || — || April 8, 2002 || Palomar || NEAT || — || align=right | 2.2 km || 
|-id=648 bgcolor=#fefefe
| 99648 || 2002 HR || — || April 16, 2002 || Desert Eagle || W. K. Y. Yeung || — || align=right | 1.6 km || 
|-id=649 bgcolor=#E9E9E9
| 99649 ||  || — || April 16, 2002 || Socorro || LINEAR || — || align=right | 2.9 km || 
|-id=650 bgcolor=#fefefe
| 99650 ||  || — || April 16, 2002 || Socorro || LINEAR || — || align=right | 1.8 km || 
|-id=651 bgcolor=#E9E9E9
| 99651 ||  || — || April 16, 2002 || Socorro || LINEAR || — || align=right | 3.2 km || 
|-id=652 bgcolor=#d6d6d6
| 99652 ||  || — || April 16, 2002 || Socorro || LINEAR || — || align=right | 10 km || 
|-id=653 bgcolor=#E9E9E9
| 99653 ||  || — || April 16, 2002 || Socorro || LINEAR || — || align=right | 3.9 km || 
|-id=654 bgcolor=#fefefe
| 99654 ||  || — || April 16, 2002 || Socorro || LINEAR || — || align=right | 4.0 km || 
|-id=655 bgcolor=#fefefe
| 99655 ||  || — || April 18, 2002 || Palomar || NEAT || — || align=right | 1.4 km || 
|-id=656 bgcolor=#fefefe
| 99656 ||  || — || April 16, 2002 || Socorro || LINEAR || V || align=right | 1.6 km || 
|-id=657 bgcolor=#E9E9E9
| 99657 ||  || — || April 16, 2002 || Socorro || LINEAR || — || align=right | 2.5 km || 
|-id=658 bgcolor=#E9E9E9
| 99658 ||  || — || April 17, 2002 || Socorro || LINEAR || WIT || align=right | 1.8 km || 
|-id=659 bgcolor=#fefefe
| 99659 ||  || — || April 29, 2002 || Palomar || NEAT || V || align=right | 1.5 km || 
|-id=660 bgcolor=#fefefe
| 99660 ||  || — || April 29, 2002 || Palomar || NEAT || — || align=right | 2.2 km || 
|-id=661 bgcolor=#E9E9E9
| 99661 ||  || — || April 22, 2002 || Socorro || LINEAR || — || align=right | 7.6 km || 
|-id=662 bgcolor=#E9E9E9
| 99662 ||  || — || April 21, 2002 || Socorro || LINEAR || — || align=right | 4.8 km || 
|-id=663 bgcolor=#fefefe
| 99663 ||  || — || April 17, 2002 || Socorro || LINEAR || V || align=right | 1.5 km || 
|-id=664 bgcolor=#E9E9E9
| 99664 ||  || — || April 18, 2002 || Kitt Peak || Spacewatch || — || align=right | 2.1 km || 
|-id=665 bgcolor=#E9E9E9
| 99665 ||  || — || April 18, 2002 || Haleakala || NEAT || DOR || align=right | 6.7 km || 
|-id=666 bgcolor=#E9E9E9
| 99666 ||  || — || April 30, 2002 || Palomar || NEAT || — || align=right | 4.8 km || 
|-id=667 bgcolor=#E9E9E9
| 99667 ||  || — || May 3, 2002 || Desert Eagle || W. K. Y. Yeung || — || align=right | 3.9 km || 
|-id=668 bgcolor=#fefefe
| 99668 ||  || — || May 5, 2002 || Desert Eagle || W. K. Y. Yeung || — || align=right | 1.9 km || 
|-id=669 bgcolor=#d6d6d6
| 99669 ||  || — || May 5, 2002 || Desert Eagle || W. K. Y. Yeung || — || align=right | 6.1 km || 
|-id=670 bgcolor=#E9E9E9
| 99670 ||  || — || May 6, 2002 || Kitt Peak || Spacewatch || MRX || align=right | 1.9 km || 
|-id=671 bgcolor=#E9E9E9
| 99671 ||  || — || May 3, 2002 || Palomar || NEAT || — || align=right | 4.3 km || 
|-id=672 bgcolor=#d6d6d6
| 99672 ||  || — || May 6, 2002 || Palomar || NEAT || — || align=right | 4.5 km || 
|-id=673 bgcolor=#fefefe
| 99673 ||  || — || May 6, 2002 || Desert Eagle || W. K. Y. Yeung || — || align=right | 2.0 km || 
|-id=674 bgcolor=#d6d6d6
| 99674 ||  || — || May 4, 2002 || Anderson Mesa || LONEOS || — || align=right | 6.5 km || 
|-id=675 bgcolor=#fefefe
| 99675 ||  || — || May 5, 2002 || Desert Eagle || W. K. Y. Yeung || FLO || align=right | 2.1 km || 
|-id=676 bgcolor=#fefefe
| 99676 ||  || — || May 6, 2002 || Desert Eagle || W. K. Y. Yeung || — || align=right | 4.4 km || 
|-id=677 bgcolor=#E9E9E9
| 99677 ||  || — || May 8, 2002 || Socorro || LINEAR || WIT || align=right | 2.4 km || 
|-id=678 bgcolor=#E9E9E9
| 99678 ||  || — || May 8, 2002 || Socorro || LINEAR || — || align=right | 5.4 km || 
|-id=679 bgcolor=#fefefe
| 99679 ||  || — || May 8, 2002 || Socorro || LINEAR || V || align=right | 1.4 km || 
|-id=680 bgcolor=#fefefe
| 99680 ||  || — || May 6, 2002 || Palomar || NEAT || — || align=right | 2.0 km || 
|-id=681 bgcolor=#E9E9E9
| 99681 ||  || — || May 7, 2002 || Palomar || NEAT || — || align=right | 5.5 km || 
|-id=682 bgcolor=#E9E9E9
| 99682 ||  || — || May 7, 2002 || Palomar || NEAT || — || align=right | 1.9 km || 
|-id=683 bgcolor=#d6d6d6
| 99683 ||  || — || May 8, 2002 || Haleakala || NEAT || — || align=right | 6.5 km || 
|-id=684 bgcolor=#d6d6d6
| 99684 ||  || — || May 8, 2002 || Haleakala || NEAT || — || align=right | 3.9 km || 
|-id=685 bgcolor=#fefefe
| 99685 ||  || — || May 8, 2002 || Haleakala || NEAT || MAS || align=right | 1.3 km || 
|-id=686 bgcolor=#d6d6d6
| 99686 ||  || — || May 8, 2002 || Socorro || LINEAR || — || align=right | 7.9 km || 
|-id=687 bgcolor=#fefefe
| 99687 ||  || — || May 8, 2002 || Socorro || LINEAR || NYS || align=right | 1.5 km || 
|-id=688 bgcolor=#E9E9E9
| 99688 ||  || — || May 8, 2002 || Socorro || LINEAR || — || align=right | 4.7 km || 
|-id=689 bgcolor=#fefefe
| 99689 ||  || — || May 8, 2002 || Socorro || LINEAR || — || align=right | 1.8 km || 
|-id=690 bgcolor=#E9E9E9
| 99690 ||  || — || May 8, 2002 || Socorro || LINEAR || — || align=right | 2.1 km || 
|-id=691 bgcolor=#fefefe
| 99691 ||  || — || May 8, 2002 || Socorro || LINEAR || CLA || align=right | 2.7 km || 
|-id=692 bgcolor=#E9E9E9
| 99692 ||  || — || May 8, 2002 || Socorro || LINEAR || — || align=right | 2.5 km || 
|-id=693 bgcolor=#d6d6d6
| 99693 ||  || — || May 9, 2002 || Socorro || LINEAR || EOS || align=right | 3.7 km || 
|-id=694 bgcolor=#fefefe
| 99694 ||  || — || May 9, 2002 || Socorro || LINEAR || V || align=right | 1.3 km || 
|-id=695 bgcolor=#E9E9E9
| 99695 ||  || — || May 9, 2002 || Socorro || LINEAR || — || align=right | 2.1 km || 
|-id=696 bgcolor=#d6d6d6
| 99696 ||  || — || May 9, 2002 || Socorro || LINEAR || — || align=right | 5.2 km || 
|-id=697 bgcolor=#fefefe
| 99697 ||  || — || May 9, 2002 || Socorro || LINEAR || MAS || align=right | 1.6 km || 
|-id=698 bgcolor=#E9E9E9
| 99698 ||  || — || May 9, 2002 || Socorro || LINEAR || — || align=right | 3.4 km || 
|-id=699 bgcolor=#d6d6d6
| 99699 ||  || — || May 9, 2002 || Socorro || LINEAR || — || align=right | 3.9 km || 
|-id=700 bgcolor=#fefefe
| 99700 ||  || — || May 9, 2002 || Socorro || LINEAR || NYS || align=right | 2.6 km || 
|}

99701–99800 

|-bgcolor=#E9E9E9
| 99701 ||  || — || May 9, 2002 || Socorro || LINEAR || — || align=right | 1.8 km || 
|-id=702 bgcolor=#fefefe
| 99702 ||  || — || May 9, 2002 || Socorro || LINEAR || — || align=right | 1.8 km || 
|-id=703 bgcolor=#E9E9E9
| 99703 ||  || — || May 9, 2002 || Socorro || LINEAR || — || align=right | 5.5 km || 
|-id=704 bgcolor=#d6d6d6
| 99704 ||  || — || May 9, 2002 || Socorro || LINEAR || — || align=right | 4.1 km || 
|-id=705 bgcolor=#d6d6d6
| 99705 ||  || — || May 7, 2002 || Anderson Mesa || LONEOS || CHA || align=right | 4.8 km || 
|-id=706 bgcolor=#d6d6d6
| 99706 ||  || — || May 8, 2002 || Haleakala || NEAT || EOS || align=right | 6.1 km || 
|-id=707 bgcolor=#d6d6d6
| 99707 ||  || — || May 9, 2002 || Palomar || NEAT || — || align=right | 6.8 km || 
|-id=708 bgcolor=#E9E9E9
| 99708 ||  || — || May 9, 2002 || Desert Eagle || W. K. Y. Yeung || — || align=right | 4.6 km || 
|-id=709 bgcolor=#d6d6d6
| 99709 ||  || — || May 10, 2002 || Desert Eagle || W. K. Y. Yeung || MEL || align=right | 11 km || 
|-id=710 bgcolor=#fefefe
| 99710 ||  || — || May 10, 2002 || Desert Eagle || W. K. Y. Yeung || — || align=right | 1.8 km || 
|-id=711 bgcolor=#fefefe
| 99711 ||  || — || May 8, 2002 || Socorro || LINEAR || V || align=right | 1.9 km || 
|-id=712 bgcolor=#fefefe
| 99712 ||  || — || May 8, 2002 || Socorro || LINEAR || NYS || align=right | 1.4 km || 
|-id=713 bgcolor=#fefefe
| 99713 ||  || — || May 8, 2002 || Socorro || LINEAR || NYS || align=right | 1.5 km || 
|-id=714 bgcolor=#fefefe
| 99714 ||  || — || May 8, 2002 || Socorro || LINEAR || — || align=right | 2.4 km || 
|-id=715 bgcolor=#d6d6d6
| 99715 ||  || — || May 8, 2002 || Socorro || LINEAR || — || align=right | 6.8 km || 
|-id=716 bgcolor=#fefefe
| 99716 ||  || — || May 8, 2002 || Socorro || LINEAR || V || align=right | 1.3 km || 
|-id=717 bgcolor=#fefefe
| 99717 ||  || — || May 9, 2002 || Socorro || LINEAR || — || align=right | 1.8 km || 
|-id=718 bgcolor=#E9E9E9
| 99718 ||  || — || May 9, 2002 || Socorro || LINEAR || — || align=right | 2.3 km || 
|-id=719 bgcolor=#fefefe
| 99719 ||  || — || May 9, 2002 || Socorro || LINEAR || — || align=right | 1.9 km || 
|-id=720 bgcolor=#fefefe
| 99720 ||  || — || May 9, 2002 || Socorro || LINEAR || — || align=right | 1.7 km || 
|-id=721 bgcolor=#fefefe
| 99721 ||  || — || May 9, 2002 || Socorro || LINEAR || — || align=right | 1.5 km || 
|-id=722 bgcolor=#fefefe
| 99722 ||  || — || May 9, 2002 || Socorro || LINEAR || — || align=right | 1.8 km || 
|-id=723 bgcolor=#d6d6d6
| 99723 ||  || — || May 9, 2002 || Socorro || LINEAR || — || align=right | 7.5 km || 
|-id=724 bgcolor=#d6d6d6
| 99724 ||  || — || May 9, 2002 || Socorro || LINEAR || — || align=right | 4.4 km || 
|-id=725 bgcolor=#fefefe
| 99725 ||  || — || May 9, 2002 || Socorro || LINEAR || V || align=right | 1.2 km || 
|-id=726 bgcolor=#fefefe
| 99726 ||  || — || May 9, 2002 || Socorro || LINEAR || NYS || align=right | 1.2 km || 
|-id=727 bgcolor=#fefefe
| 99727 ||  || — || May 9, 2002 || Socorro || LINEAR || — || align=right | 1.3 km || 
|-id=728 bgcolor=#fefefe
| 99728 ||  || — || May 9, 2002 || Socorro || LINEAR || MAS || align=right | 1.6 km || 
|-id=729 bgcolor=#fefefe
| 99729 ||  || — || May 9, 2002 || Socorro || LINEAR || NYS || align=right | 1.2 km || 
|-id=730 bgcolor=#d6d6d6
| 99730 ||  || — || May 9, 2002 || Socorro || LINEAR || — || align=right | 5.0 km || 
|-id=731 bgcolor=#fefefe
| 99731 ||  || — || May 9, 2002 || Socorro || LINEAR || — || align=right | 1.8 km || 
|-id=732 bgcolor=#d6d6d6
| 99732 ||  || — || May 9, 2002 || Socorro || LINEAR || — || align=right | 6.3 km || 
|-id=733 bgcolor=#d6d6d6
| 99733 ||  || — || May 9, 2002 || Socorro || LINEAR || — || align=right | 5.2 km || 
|-id=734 bgcolor=#fefefe
| 99734 ||  || — || May 8, 2002 || Socorro || LINEAR || — || align=right | 3.9 km || 
|-id=735 bgcolor=#fefefe
| 99735 ||  || — || May 8, 2002 || Socorro || LINEAR || V || align=right | 1.6 km || 
|-id=736 bgcolor=#fefefe
| 99736 ||  || — || May 8, 2002 || Socorro || LINEAR || FLO || align=right | 1.4 km || 
|-id=737 bgcolor=#fefefe
| 99737 ||  || — || May 9, 2002 || Socorro || LINEAR || NYS || align=right | 1.4 km || 
|-id=738 bgcolor=#d6d6d6
| 99738 ||  || — || May 9, 2002 || Socorro || LINEAR || — || align=right | 6.5 km || 
|-id=739 bgcolor=#E9E9E9
| 99739 ||  || — || May 9, 2002 || Socorro || LINEAR || — || align=right | 2.4 km || 
|-id=740 bgcolor=#E9E9E9
| 99740 ||  || — || May 9, 2002 || Socorro || LINEAR || — || align=right | 2.2 km || 
|-id=741 bgcolor=#fefefe
| 99741 ||  || — || May 10, 2002 || Socorro || LINEAR || NYS || align=right | 1.2 km || 
|-id=742 bgcolor=#fefefe
| 99742 ||  || — || May 7, 2002 || Socorro || LINEAR || V || align=right | 1.3 km || 
|-id=743 bgcolor=#fefefe
| 99743 ||  || — || May 7, 2002 || Socorro || LINEAR || — || align=right | 1.5 km || 
|-id=744 bgcolor=#E9E9E9
| 99744 ||  || — || May 7, 2002 || Socorro || LINEAR || EUN || align=right | 2.2 km || 
|-id=745 bgcolor=#fefefe
| 99745 ||  || — || May 8, 2002 || Socorro || LINEAR || FLO || align=right | 1.3 km || 
|-id=746 bgcolor=#E9E9E9
| 99746 ||  || — || May 8, 2002 || Socorro || LINEAR || — || align=right | 5.1 km || 
|-id=747 bgcolor=#d6d6d6
| 99747 ||  || — || May 9, 2002 || Socorro || LINEAR || — || align=right | 6.4 km || 
|-id=748 bgcolor=#fefefe
| 99748 ||  || — || May 11, 2002 || Socorro || LINEAR || MAS || align=right | 1.4 km || 
|-id=749 bgcolor=#E9E9E9
| 99749 ||  || — || May 11, 2002 || Socorro || LINEAR || — || align=right | 3.9 km || 
|-id=750 bgcolor=#fefefe
| 99750 ||  || — || May 11, 2002 || Socorro || LINEAR || — || align=right | 1.4 km || 
|-id=751 bgcolor=#d6d6d6
| 99751 ||  || — || May 11, 2002 || Socorro || LINEAR || — || align=right | 4.7 km || 
|-id=752 bgcolor=#E9E9E9
| 99752 ||  || — || May 11, 2002 || Socorro || LINEAR || NEM || align=right | 4.7 km || 
|-id=753 bgcolor=#d6d6d6
| 99753 ||  || — || May 11, 2002 || Socorro || LINEAR || — || align=right | 4.9 km || 
|-id=754 bgcolor=#E9E9E9
| 99754 ||  || — || May 11, 2002 || Socorro || LINEAR || — || align=right | 2.5 km || 
|-id=755 bgcolor=#fefefe
| 99755 ||  || — || May 11, 2002 || Socorro || LINEAR || — || align=right | 2.6 km || 
|-id=756 bgcolor=#fefefe
| 99756 ||  || — || May 11, 2002 || Socorro || LINEAR || NYS || align=right | 1.2 km || 
|-id=757 bgcolor=#fefefe
| 99757 ||  || — || May 11, 2002 || Socorro || LINEAR || — || align=right | 1.3 km || 
|-id=758 bgcolor=#d6d6d6
| 99758 ||  || — || May 11, 2002 || Socorro || LINEAR || — || align=right | 5.1 km || 
|-id=759 bgcolor=#E9E9E9
| 99759 ||  || — || May 8, 2002 || Socorro || LINEAR || — || align=right | 2.6 km || 
|-id=760 bgcolor=#E9E9E9
| 99760 ||  || — || May 15, 2002 || Fountain Hills || Fountain Hills Obs. || — || align=right | 5.6 km || 
|-id=761 bgcolor=#FA8072
| 99761 ||  || — || May 15, 2002 || Socorro || LINEAR || — || align=right | 1.9 km || 
|-id=762 bgcolor=#E9E9E9
| 99762 ||  || — || May 9, 2002 || Socorro || LINEAR || — || align=right | 2.5 km || 
|-id=763 bgcolor=#fefefe
| 99763 ||  || — || May 9, 2002 || Socorro || LINEAR || MAS || align=right | 1.8 km || 
|-id=764 bgcolor=#d6d6d6
| 99764 ||  || — || May 9, 2002 || Socorro || LINEAR || KOR || align=right | 3.2 km || 
|-id=765 bgcolor=#fefefe
| 99765 ||  || — || May 9, 2002 || Socorro || LINEAR || — || align=right | 1.6 km || 
|-id=766 bgcolor=#d6d6d6
| 99766 ||  || — || May 9, 2002 || Socorro || LINEAR || KOR || align=right | 3.0 km || 
|-id=767 bgcolor=#d6d6d6
| 99767 ||  || — || May 11, 2002 || Socorro || LINEAR || — || align=right | 6.3 km || 
|-id=768 bgcolor=#d6d6d6
| 99768 ||  || — || May 11, 2002 || Socorro || LINEAR || THM || align=right | 5.0 km || 
|-id=769 bgcolor=#fefefe
| 99769 ||  || — || May 14, 2002 || Socorro || LINEAR || FLO || align=right | 1.5 km || 
|-id=770 bgcolor=#d6d6d6
| 99770 ||  || — || May 11, 2002 || Palomar || NEAT || — || align=right | 7.2 km || 
|-id=771 bgcolor=#fefefe
| 99771 ||  || — || May 11, 2002 || Socorro || LINEAR || — || align=right | 1.5 km || 
|-id=772 bgcolor=#fefefe
| 99772 ||  || — || May 11, 2002 || Socorro || LINEAR || FLO || align=right | 1.4 km || 
|-id=773 bgcolor=#E9E9E9
| 99773 ||  || — || May 11, 2002 || Socorro || LINEAR || — || align=right | 2.9 km || 
|-id=774 bgcolor=#E9E9E9
| 99774 ||  || — || May 11, 2002 || Socorro || LINEAR || — || align=right | 2.4 km || 
|-id=775 bgcolor=#E9E9E9
| 99775 ||  || — || May 13, 2002 || Palomar || NEAT || — || align=right | 4.7 km || 
|-id=776 bgcolor=#E9E9E9
| 99776 ||  || — || May 13, 2002 || Socorro || LINEAR || — || align=right | 5.9 km || 
|-id=777 bgcolor=#fefefe
| 99777 ||  || — || May 13, 2002 || Socorro || LINEAR || — || align=right | 2.1 km || 
|-id=778 bgcolor=#d6d6d6
| 99778 ||  || — || May 13, 2002 || Socorro || LINEAR || — || align=right | 6.4 km || 
|-id=779 bgcolor=#fefefe
| 99779 ||  || — || May 15, 2002 || Haleakala || NEAT || V || align=right | 1.2 km || 
|-id=780 bgcolor=#fefefe
| 99780 ||  || — || May 3, 2002 || Kitt Peak || Spacewatch || V || align=right | 1.5 km || 
|-id=781 bgcolor=#E9E9E9
| 99781 ||  || — || May 5, 2002 || Palomar || NEAT || — || align=right | 2.2 km || 
|-id=782 bgcolor=#E9E9E9
| 99782 ||  || — || May 5, 2002 || Palomar || NEAT || — || align=right | 4.9 km || 
|-id=783 bgcolor=#E9E9E9
| 99783 ||  || — || May 7, 2002 || Anderson Mesa || LONEOS || — || align=right | 2.5 km || 
|-id=784 bgcolor=#E9E9E9
| 99784 ||  || — || May 8, 2002 || Socorro || LINEAR || — || align=right | 4.1 km || 
|-id=785 bgcolor=#d6d6d6
| 99785 ||  || — || May 9, 2002 || Socorro || LINEAR || HYG || align=right | 5.7 km || 
|-id=786 bgcolor=#E9E9E9
| 99786 ||  || — || May 10, 2002 || Palomar || NEAT || GEF || align=right | 2.1 km || 
|-id=787 bgcolor=#fefefe
| 99787 ||  || — || May 15, 2002 || Haleakala || NEAT || V || align=right | 1.2 km || 
|-id=788 bgcolor=#d6d6d6
| 99788 ||  || — || May 16, 2002 || Socorro || LINEAR || KOR || align=right | 3.0 km || 
|-id=789 bgcolor=#fefefe
| 99789 ||  || — || May 18, 2002 || Palomar || NEAT || — || align=right | 2.0 km || 
|-id=790 bgcolor=#fefefe
| 99790 ||  || — || May 18, 2002 || Palomar || NEAT || — || align=right | 1.0 km || 
|-id=791 bgcolor=#E9E9E9
| 99791 ||  || — || May 18, 2002 || Palomar || NEAT || BRU || align=right | 8.1 km || 
|-id=792 bgcolor=#d6d6d6
| 99792 ||  || — || May 16, 2002 || Socorro || LINEAR || HYG || align=right | 5.9 km || 
|-id=793 bgcolor=#fefefe
| 99793 ||  || — || May 16, 2002 || Socorro || LINEAR || MAS || align=right | 1.3 km || 
|-id=794 bgcolor=#fefefe
| 99794 ||  || — || May 16, 2002 || Socorro || LINEAR || MAS || align=right | 1.6 km || 
|-id=795 bgcolor=#FA8072
| 99795 ||  || — || May 19, 2002 || Anderson Mesa || LONEOS || — || align=right | 2.2 km || 
|-id=796 bgcolor=#d6d6d6
| 99796 ||  || — || May 17, 2002 || Kitt Peak || Spacewatch || — || align=right | 6.4 km || 
|-id=797 bgcolor=#fefefe
| 99797 ||  || — || May 18, 2002 || Palomar || NEAT || — || align=right | 1.6 km || 
|-id=798 bgcolor=#E9E9E9
| 99798 || 2002 LT || — || June 2, 2002 || Socorro || LINEAR || HNS || align=right | 5.6 km || 
|-id=799 bgcolor=#FFC2E0
| 99799 ||  || — || June 5, 2002 || Haleakala || NEAT || AMO || align=right data-sort-value="0.75" | 750 m || 
|-id=800 bgcolor=#E9E9E9
| 99800 ||  || — || June 2, 2002 || Palomar || NEAT || DOR || align=right | 6.0 km || 
|}

99801–99900 

|-bgcolor=#d6d6d6
| 99801 ||  || — || June 5, 2002 || Socorro || LINEAR || — || align=right | 5.0 km || 
|-id=802 bgcolor=#fefefe
| 99802 ||  || — || June 5, 2002 || Socorro || LINEAR || — || align=right | 1.8 km || 
|-id=803 bgcolor=#d6d6d6
| 99803 ||  || — || June 6, 2002 || Socorro || LINEAR || EOS || align=right | 5.6 km || 
|-id=804 bgcolor=#fefefe
| 99804 ||  || — || June 6, 2002 || Socorro || LINEAR || V || align=right | 1.4 km || 
|-id=805 bgcolor=#fefefe
| 99805 ||  || — || June 6, 2002 || Socorro || LINEAR || NYS || align=right | 3.7 km || 
|-id=806 bgcolor=#d6d6d6
| 99806 ||  || — || June 6, 2002 || Socorro || LINEAR || VER || align=right | 6.6 km || 
|-id=807 bgcolor=#E9E9E9
| 99807 ||  || — || June 6, 2002 || Socorro || LINEAR || MAR || align=right | 2.7 km || 
|-id=808 bgcolor=#E9E9E9
| 99808 ||  || — || June 6, 2002 || Socorro || LINEAR || — || align=right | 1.9 km || 
|-id=809 bgcolor=#E9E9E9
| 99809 ||  || — || June 6, 2002 || Socorro || LINEAR || GEF || align=right | 2.6 km || 
|-id=810 bgcolor=#d6d6d6
| 99810 ||  || — || June 8, 2002 || Socorro || LINEAR || HYG || align=right | 5.4 km || 
|-id=811 bgcolor=#E9E9E9
| 99811 ||  || — || June 3, 2002 || Socorro || LINEAR || MAR || align=right | 2.6 km || 
|-id=812 bgcolor=#d6d6d6
| 99812 ||  || — || June 8, 2002 || Socorro || LINEAR || slow || align=right | 8.7 km || 
|-id=813 bgcolor=#E9E9E9
| 99813 ||  || — || June 8, 2002 || Socorro || LINEAR || BRG || align=right | 2.8 km || 
|-id=814 bgcolor=#d6d6d6
| 99814 ||  || — || June 10, 2002 || Socorro || LINEAR || ALA || align=right | 12 km || 
|-id=815 bgcolor=#E9E9E9
| 99815 ||  || — || June 6, 2002 || Socorro || LINEAR || — || align=right | 6.5 km || 
|-id=816 bgcolor=#d6d6d6
| 99816 ||  || — || June 5, 2002 || Kitt Peak || Spacewatch || — || align=right | 5.4 km || 
|-id=817 bgcolor=#E9E9E9
| 99817 ||  || — || June 7, 2002 || Palomar || NEAT || — || align=right | 2.2 km || 
|-id=818 bgcolor=#E9E9E9
| 99818 ||  || — || June 9, 2002 || Socorro || LINEAR || — || align=right | 2.2 km || 
|-id=819 bgcolor=#E9E9E9
| 99819 ||  || — || June 9, 2002 || Socorro || LINEAR || — || align=right | 2.5 km || 
|-id=820 bgcolor=#fefefe
| 99820 ||  || — || June 15, 2002 || Socorro || LINEAR || PHO || align=right | 2.8 km || 
|-id=821 bgcolor=#E9E9E9
| 99821 ||  || — || June 10, 2002 || Palomar || NEAT || — || align=right | 2.7 km || 
|-id=822 bgcolor=#d6d6d6
| 99822 || 2002 MA || — || June 16, 2002 || Kitt Peak || Spacewatch || — || align=right | 7.9 km || 
|-id=823 bgcolor=#d6d6d6
| 99823 ||  || — || June 16, 2002 || Palomar || NEAT || — || align=right | 6.4 km || 
|-id=824 bgcolor=#E9E9E9
| 99824 Polnareff ||  ||  || June 29, 2002 || Vicques || M. Ory || — || align=right | 2.6 km || 
|-id=825 bgcolor=#d6d6d6
| 99825 ||  || — || July 12, 2002 || Reedy Creek || J. Broughton || — || align=right | 8.5 km || 
|-id=826 bgcolor=#d6d6d6
| 99826 ||  || — || July 9, 2002 || Socorro || LINEAR || — || align=right | 7.8 km || 
|-id=827 bgcolor=#d6d6d6
| 99827 ||  || — || July 3, 2002 || Palomar || NEAT || — || align=right | 5.5 km || 
|-id=828 bgcolor=#E9E9E9
| 99828 ||  || — || July 3, 2002 || Palomar || NEAT || — || align=right | 2.0 km || 
|-id=829 bgcolor=#d6d6d6
| 99829 ||  || — || July 3, 2002 || Palomar || NEAT || HYG || align=right | 6.4 km || 
|-id=830 bgcolor=#d6d6d6
| 99830 ||  || — || July 4, 2002 || Palomar || NEAT || — || align=right | 5.0 km || 
|-id=831 bgcolor=#E9E9E9
| 99831 ||  || — || July 4, 2002 || Palomar || NEAT || MRX || align=right | 2.1 km || 
|-id=832 bgcolor=#E9E9E9
| 99832 ||  || — || July 4, 2002 || Palomar || NEAT || — || align=right | 2.1 km || 
|-id=833 bgcolor=#d6d6d6
| 99833 ||  || — || July 9, 2002 || Socorro || LINEAR || URS || align=right | 8.3 km || 
|-id=834 bgcolor=#E9E9E9
| 99834 ||  || — || July 9, 2002 || Socorro || LINEAR || INO || align=right | 3.2 km || 
|-id=835 bgcolor=#E9E9E9
| 99835 ||  || — || July 9, 2002 || Socorro || LINEAR || EUN || align=right | 2.6 km || 
|-id=836 bgcolor=#d6d6d6
| 99836 ||  || — || July 9, 2002 || Socorro || LINEAR || EOS || align=right | 4.0 km || 
|-id=837 bgcolor=#fefefe
| 99837 ||  || — || July 9, 2002 || Socorro || LINEAR || ERI || align=right | 5.5 km || 
|-id=838 bgcolor=#d6d6d6
| 99838 ||  || — || July 9, 2002 || Socorro || LINEAR || — || align=right | 4.8 km || 
|-id=839 bgcolor=#d6d6d6
| 99839 ||  || — || July 9, 2002 || Socorro || LINEAR || EOS || align=right | 5.1 km || 
|-id=840 bgcolor=#d6d6d6
| 99840 ||  || — || July 12, 2002 || Palomar || NEAT || — || align=right | 5.0 km || 
|-id=841 bgcolor=#d6d6d6
| 99841 ||  || — || July 13, 2002 || Socorro || LINEAR || — || align=right | 8.1 km || 
|-id=842 bgcolor=#d6d6d6
| 99842 ||  || — || July 13, 2002 || Palomar || NEAT || — || align=right | 9.2 km || 
|-id=843 bgcolor=#d6d6d6
| 99843 ||  || — || July 9, 2002 || Socorro || LINEAR || VER || align=right | 8.6 km || 
|-id=844 bgcolor=#d6d6d6
| 99844 ||  || — || July 14, 2002 || Palomar || NEAT || — || align=right | 7.6 km || 
|-id=845 bgcolor=#E9E9E9
| 99845 ||  || — || July 15, 2002 || Palomar || NEAT || EUN || align=right | 2.9 km || 
|-id=846 bgcolor=#E9E9E9
| 99846 ||  || — || July 13, 2002 || Palomar || NEAT || MAR || align=right | 1.8 km || 
|-id=847 bgcolor=#E9E9E9
| 99847 ||  || — || July 13, 2002 || Haleakala || NEAT || — || align=right | 3.1 km || 
|-id=848 bgcolor=#d6d6d6
| 99848 ||  || — || July 13, 2002 || Haleakala || NEAT || THM || align=right | 5.4 km || 
|-id=849 bgcolor=#E9E9E9
| 99849 ||  || — || July 5, 2002 || Socorro || LINEAR || MAR || align=right | 3.6 km || 
|-id=850 bgcolor=#d6d6d6
| 99850 ||  || — || July 14, 2002 || Palomar || NEAT || SHU3:2 || align=right | 13 km || 
|-id=851 bgcolor=#d6d6d6
| 99851 ||  || — || July 17, 2002 || Socorro || LINEAR || ALA || align=right | 9.4 km || 
|-id=852 bgcolor=#d6d6d6
| 99852 ||  || — || July 19, 2002 || Palomar || NEAT || HYG || align=right | 6.2 km || 
|-id=853 bgcolor=#E9E9E9
| 99853 ||  || — || July 21, 2002 || Palomar || NEAT || DOR || align=right | 4.7 km || 
|-id=854 bgcolor=#d6d6d6
| 99854 ||  || — || July 21, 2002 || Palomar || NEAT || — || align=right | 7.1 km || 
|-id=855 bgcolor=#d6d6d6
| 99855 ||  || — || July 21, 2002 || Palomar || NEAT || — || align=right | 5.7 km || 
|-id=856 bgcolor=#E9E9E9
| 99856 ||  || — || July 18, 2002 || Socorro || LINEAR || EUN || align=right | 2.3 km || 
|-id=857 bgcolor=#d6d6d6
| 99857 ||  || — || July 18, 2002 || Socorro || LINEAR || EOS || align=right | 5.5 km || 
|-id=858 bgcolor=#E9E9E9
| 99858 ||  || — || July 22, 2002 || Palomar || NEAT || — || align=right | 2.5 km || 
|-id=859 bgcolor=#d6d6d6
| 99859 ||  || — || July 22, 2002 || Palomar || NEAT || — || align=right | 8.6 km || 
|-id=860 bgcolor=#E9E9E9
| 99860 ||  || — || July 23, 2002 || Palomar || NEAT || — || align=right | 1.6 km || 
|-id=861 bgcolor=#d6d6d6
| 99861 Tscharnuter ||  ||  || July 29, 2002 || Palomar || S. F. Hönig || KOR || align=right | 3.0 km || 
|-id=862 bgcolor=#d6d6d6
| 99862 Kenlevin ||  ||  || July 23, 2002 || Palomar || S. F. Hönig || HIL3:2 || align=right | 7.3 km || 
|-id=863 bgcolor=#d6d6d6
| 99863 Winnewisser ||  ||  || July 23, 2002 || Palomar || NEAT || KOR || align=right | 2.3 km || 
|-id=864 bgcolor=#d6d6d6
| 99864 ||  || — || July 23, 2002 || Palomar || NEAT || — || align=right | 6.1 km || 
|-id=865 bgcolor=#d6d6d6
| 99865 ||  || — || August 6, 2002 || Palomar || NEAT || ALA || align=right | 8.2 km || 
|-id=866 bgcolor=#d6d6d6
| 99866 ||  || — || August 6, 2002 || Palomar || NEAT || — || align=right | 4.8 km || 
|-id=867 bgcolor=#d6d6d6
| 99867 ||  || — || August 6, 2002 || Palomar || NEAT || — || align=right | 4.7 km || 
|-id=868 bgcolor=#d6d6d6
| 99868 ||  || — || August 6, 2002 || Palomar || NEAT || EOS || align=right | 4.6 km || 
|-id=869 bgcolor=#FA8072
| 99869 ||  || — || August 9, 2002 || Socorro || LINEAR || — || align=right | 2.5 km || 
|-id=870 bgcolor=#d6d6d6
| 99870 ||  || — || August 10, 2002 || Socorro || LINEAR || — || align=right | 7.9 km || 
|-id=871 bgcolor=#d6d6d6
| 99871 ||  || — || August 8, 2002 || Palomar || NEAT || — || align=right | 5.4 km || 
|-id=872 bgcolor=#d6d6d6
| 99872 ||  || — || August 8, 2002 || Palomar || NEAT || — || align=right | 4.1 km || 
|-id=873 bgcolor=#d6d6d6
| 99873 ||  || — || August 8, 2002 || Palomar || NEAT || — || align=right | 7.6 km || 
|-id=874 bgcolor=#d6d6d6
| 99874 ||  || — || August 11, 2002 || Socorro || LINEAR || — || align=right | 4.3 km || 
|-id=875 bgcolor=#d6d6d6
| 99875 ||  || — || August 12, 2002 || Socorro || LINEAR || ALA || align=right | 8.4 km || 
|-id=876 bgcolor=#d6d6d6
| 99876 ||  || — || August 12, 2002 || Socorro || LINEAR || — || align=right | 9.6 km || 
|-id=877 bgcolor=#d6d6d6
| 99877 ||  || — || August 11, 2002 || Palomar || NEAT || 3:2 || align=right | 15 km || 
|-id=878 bgcolor=#d6d6d6
| 99878 ||  || — || August 10, 2002 || Socorro || LINEAR || KOR || align=right | 3.6 km || 
|-id=879 bgcolor=#d6d6d6
| 99879 ||  || — || August 10, 2002 || Socorro || LINEAR || — || align=right | 6.0 km || 
|-id=880 bgcolor=#d6d6d6
| 99880 ||  || — || August 14, 2002 || Socorro || LINEAR || — || align=right | 4.2 km || 
|-id=881 bgcolor=#d6d6d6
| 99881 ||  || — || August 14, 2002 || Socorro || LINEAR || EOS || align=right | 3.9 km || 
|-id=882 bgcolor=#d6d6d6
| 99882 ||  || — || August 11, 2002 || Haleakala || NEAT || — || align=right | 4.0 km || 
|-id=883 bgcolor=#d6d6d6
| 99883 ||  || — || August 14, 2002 || Socorro || LINEAR || — || align=right | 7.7 km || 
|-id=884 bgcolor=#d6d6d6
| 99884 ||  || — || August 14, 2002 || Socorro || LINEAR || — || align=right | 4.3 km || 
|-id=885 bgcolor=#d6d6d6
| 99885 ||  || — || August 8, 2002 || Palomar || S. F. Hönig || — || align=right | 6.4 km || 
|-id=886 bgcolor=#E9E9E9
| 99886 ||  || — || August 8, 2002 || Palomar || S. F. Hönig || — || align=right | 2.7 km || 
|-id=887 bgcolor=#d6d6d6
| 99887 ||  || — || August 8, 2002 || Palomar || S. F. Hönig || — || align=right | 4.8 km || 
|-id=888 bgcolor=#d6d6d6
| 99888 ||  || — || August 8, 2002 || Palomar || S. F. Hönig || KOR || align=right | 2.3 km || 
|-id=889 bgcolor=#d6d6d6
| 99889 ||  || — || August 8, 2002 || Palomar || S. F. Hönig || HYG || align=right | 8.3 km || 
|-id=890 bgcolor=#d6d6d6
| 99890 ||  || — || August 8, 2002 || Palomar || S. F. Hönig || — || align=right | 3.9 km || 
|-id=891 bgcolor=#d6d6d6
| 99891 Donwells ||  ||  || August 9, 2002 || Haleakala || A. Lowe || — || align=right | 5.1 km || 
|-id=892 bgcolor=#d6d6d6
| 99892 || 2002 QL || — || August 16, 2002 || Anderson Mesa || LONEOS || ALA || align=right | 9.3 km || 
|-id=893 bgcolor=#d6d6d6
| 99893 || 2002 QX || — || August 16, 2002 || Haleakala || NEAT || — || align=right | 5.6 km || 
|-id=894 bgcolor=#d6d6d6
| 99894 ||  || — || August 16, 2002 || Haleakala || NEAT || — || align=right | 5.9 km || 
|-id=895 bgcolor=#d6d6d6
| 99895 ||  || — || August 16, 2002 || Anderson Mesa || LONEOS || — || align=right | 13 km || 
|-id=896 bgcolor=#d6d6d6
| 99896 ||  || — || August 16, 2002 || Palomar || NEAT || — || align=right | 6.9 km || 
|-id=897 bgcolor=#d6d6d6
| 99897 ||  || — || August 26, 2002 || Palomar || NEAT || — || align=right | 8.1 km || 
|-id=898 bgcolor=#E9E9E9
| 99898 ||  || — || August 29, 2002 || Palomar || NEAT || — || align=right | 1.7 km || 
|-id=899 bgcolor=#d6d6d6
| 99899 ||  || — || August 29, 2002 || Palomar || NEAT || — || align=right | 11 km || 
|-id=900 bgcolor=#E9E9E9
| 99900 ||  || — || August 29, 2002 || Palomar || NEAT || JUN || align=right | 3.3 km || 
|}

99901–100000 

|-bgcolor=#d6d6d6
| 99901 ||  || — || August 29, 2002 || Palomar || NEAT || EOS || align=right | 4.2 km || 
|-id=902 bgcolor=#fefefe
| 99902 ||  || — || August 18, 2002 || Palomar || S. F. Hönig || — || align=right | 1.2 km || 
|-id=903 bgcolor=#E9E9E9
| 99903 ||  || — || August 17, 2002 || Palomar || S. F. Hönig || AST || align=right | 4.2 km || 
|-id=904 bgcolor=#d6d6d6
| 99904 ||  || — || August 27, 2002 || Palomar || S. F. Hönig || — || align=right | 4.3 km || 
|-id=905 bgcolor=#d6d6d6
| 99905 Jeffgrossman ||  ||  || August 27, 2002 || Palomar || R. Matson || 7:4 || align=right | 6.3 km || 
|-id=906 bgcolor=#d6d6d6
| 99906 Uofalberta ||  ||  || August 17, 2002 || Palomar || A. Lowe || — || align=right | 6.8 km || 
|-id=907 bgcolor=#FFC2E0
| 99907 || 1989 VA || — || November 2, 1989 || Palomar || C. S. Shoemaker || ATE +1km || align=right | 1.4 km || 
|-id=908 bgcolor=#E9E9E9
| 99908 ||  || — || July 20, 1990 || Palomar || A. Lowe || — || align=right | 2.6 km || 
|-id=909 bgcolor=#E9E9E9
| 99909 ||  || — || August 10, 1994 || La Silla || E. W. Elst || — || align=right | 1.8 km || 
|-id=910 bgcolor=#E9E9E9
| 99910 ||  || — || October 2, 1994 || Kitt Peak || Spacewatch || — || align=right | 2.0 km || 
|-id=911 bgcolor=#fefefe
| 99911 ||  || — || September 28, 1995 || Xinglong || SCAP || NYS || align=right | 2.0 km || 
|-id=912 bgcolor=#fefefe
| 99912 ||  || — || October 31, 1995 || Modra || A. Galád, A. Pravda || — || align=right | 2.9 km || 
|-id=913 bgcolor=#FA8072
| 99913 ||  || — || February 7, 1997 || Haleakala || NEAT || moon || align=right | 6.0 km || 
|-id=914 bgcolor=#d6d6d6
| 99914 ||  || — || September 30, 1997 || Kitt Peak || Spacewatch || KOR || align=right | 2.8 km || 
|-id=915 bgcolor=#FA8072
| 99915 Henarejos ||  ||  || October 2, 1997 || Caussols || ODAS || — || align=right | 4.1 km || 
|-id=916 bgcolor=#E9E9E9
| 99916 ||  || — || January 3, 1998 || Woomera || F. B. Zoltowski || GEF || align=right | 3.6 km || 
|-id=917 bgcolor=#fefefe
| 99917 ||  || — || April 18, 1998 || Socorro || LINEAR || FLO || align=right | 2.0 km || 
|-id=918 bgcolor=#E9E9E9
| 99918 ||  || — || September 18, 1998 || Catalina || CSS || — || align=right | 3.8 km || 
|-id=919 bgcolor=#fefefe
| 99919 ||  || — || September 8, 1999 || Ondřejov || L. Kotková || FLO || align=right | 2.1 km || 
|-id=920 bgcolor=#E9E9E9
| 99920 ||  || — || September 7, 1999 || Socorro || LINEAR || — || align=right | 3.1 km || 
|-id=921 bgcolor=#fefefe
| 99921 ||  || — || September 15, 1999 || Ondřejov || P. Pravec, P. Kušnirák || V || align=right | 1.8 km || 
|-id=922 bgcolor=#fefefe
| 99922 ||  || — || September 13, 1999 || Socorro || LINEAR || FLO || align=right | 1.8 km || 
|-id=923 bgcolor=#fefefe
| 99923 ||  || — || December 4, 1999 || Catalina || CSS || — || align=right | 2.7 km || 
|-id=924 bgcolor=#E9E9E9
| 99924 ||  || — || January 4, 2000 || Socorro || LINEAR || MAR || align=right | 2.9 km || 
|-id=925 bgcolor=#E9E9E9
| 99925 ||  || — || February 4, 2000 || Socorro || LINEAR || — || align=right | 3.6 km || 
|-id=926 bgcolor=#E9E9E9
| 99926 ||  || — || February 8, 2000 || Socorro || LINEAR || — || align=right | 2.4 km || 
|-id=927 bgcolor=#E9E9E9
| 99927 ||  || — || March 9, 2000 || Socorro || LINEAR || — || align=right | 2.8 km || 
|-id=928 bgcolor=#d6d6d6
| 99928 Brainard ||  ||  || March 4, 2000 || Catalina || CSS || — || align=right | 8.2 km || 
|-id=929 bgcolor=#E9E9E9
| 99929 ||  || — || March 29, 2000 || Socorro || LINEAR || — || align=right | 3.0 km || 
|-id=930 bgcolor=#d6d6d6
| 99930 ||  || — || April 4, 2000 || Socorro || LINEAR || EOS || align=right | 5.4 km || 
|-id=931 bgcolor=#fefefe
| 99931 ||  || — || September 24, 2000 || Socorro || LINEAR || — || align=right | 1.8 km || 
|-id=932 bgcolor=#fefefe
| 99932 ||  || — || November 1, 2000 || Socorro || LINEAR || — || align=right | 2.2 km || 
|-id=933 bgcolor=#fefefe
| 99933 ||  || — || December 30, 2000 || Socorro || LINEAR || — || align=right | 1.8 km || 
|-id=934 bgcolor=#fefefe
| 99934 ||  || — || February 16, 2001 || Socorro || LINEAR || FLO || align=right | 1.8 km || 
|-id=935 bgcolor=#FFC2E0
| 99935 ||  || — || January 8, 2002 || Socorro || LINEAR || APO +1km || align=right | 2.2 km || 
|-id=936 bgcolor=#d6d6d6
| 99936 ||  || — || September 11, 2002 || Palomar || NEAT || — || align=right | 11 km || 
|-id=937 bgcolor=#d6d6d6
| 99937 ||  || — || August 25, 2003 || Socorro || LINEAR || KOR || align=right | 3.8 km || 
|-id=938 bgcolor=#E9E9E9
| 99938 ||  || — || October 19, 2003 || Palomar || NEAT || — || align=right | 4.0 km || 
|-id=939 bgcolor=#d6d6d6
| 99939 ||  || — || October 20, 2003 || Socorro || LINEAR || — || align=right | 6.9 km || 
|-id=940 bgcolor=#fefefe
| 99940 ||  || — || October 27, 2003 || Socorro || LINEAR || V || align=right | 1.7 km || 
|-id=941 bgcolor=#E9E9E9
| 99941 Lonniewege ||  ||  || November 23, 2003 || Catalina || CSS || EUN || align=right | 3.4 km || 
|-id=942 bgcolor=#FFC2E0
| 99942 Apophis ||  ||  || June 19, 2004 || Kitt Peak || R. A. Tucker, D. J. Tholen, F. Bernardi || ATEPHA || align=right data-sort-value="0.33" | 330 m || 
|-id=943 bgcolor=#C2FFFF
| 99943 ||  || — || January 6, 2005 || Catalina || CSS || L5 || align=right | 23 km || 
|-id=944 bgcolor=#d6d6d6
| 99944 || 2710 P-L || — || September 24, 1960 || Palomar || PLS || — || align=right | 7.4 km || 
|-id=945 bgcolor=#fefefe
| 99945 || 4589 P-L || — || September 24, 1960 || Palomar || PLS || — || align=right | 2.7 km || 
|-id=946 bgcolor=#fefefe
| 99946 || 4134 T-1 || — || March 26, 1971 || Palomar || PLS || NYS || align=right | 2.2 km || 
|-id=947 bgcolor=#E9E9E9
| 99947 || 4220 T-2 || — || September 29, 1973 || Palomar || PLS || — || align=right | 2.9 km || 
|-id=948 bgcolor=#E9E9E9
| 99948 ||  || — || September 23, 1952 || Mount Wilson || L. E. Cunningham || — || align=right | 2.2 km || 
|-id=949 bgcolor=#E9E9E9
| 99949 Miepgies || 1972 FD ||  || March 16, 1972 || Palomar || T. Gehrels || — || align=right | 9.3 km || 
|-id=950 bgcolor=#C2FFFF
| 99950 Euchenor ||  ||  || September 19, 1973 || Palomar || C. J. van Houten, I. van Houten-Groeneveld, T. Gehrels || L4 || align=right | 18 km || 
|-id=951 bgcolor=#d6d6d6
| 99951 ||  || — || September 30, 1975 || Palomar || S. J. Bus || HYG || align=right | 5.1 km || 
|-id=952 bgcolor=#fefefe
| 99952 ||  || — || September 30, 1975 || Palomar || S. J. Bus || KLI || align=right | 3.0 km || 
|-id=953 bgcolor=#E9E9E9
| 99953 || 1978 ND || — || July 7, 1978 || Palomar || C. T. Kowal || PAL || align=right | 4.7 km || 
|-id=954 bgcolor=#d6d6d6
| 99954 || 1978 NH || — || July 10, 1978 || Palomar || E. F. Helin, E. M. Shoemaker || — || align=right | 6.8 km || 
|-id=955 bgcolor=#E9E9E9
| 99955 ||  || — || October 27, 1978 || Palomar || C. M. Olmstead || GEF || align=right | 2.2 km || 
|-id=956 bgcolor=#E9E9E9
| 99956 || 1978 VA || — || November 5, 1978 || Palomar || E. F. Helin || — || align=right | 3.1 km || 
|-id=957 bgcolor=#E9E9E9
| 99957 ||  || — || November 7, 1978 || Palomar || E. F. Helin, S. J. Bus || — || align=right | 2.4 km || 
|-id=958 bgcolor=#fefefe
| 99958 ||  || — || November 6, 1978 || Palomar || E. F. Helin, S. J. Bus || NYS || align=right | 1.1 km || 
|-id=959 bgcolor=#E9E9E9
| 99959 ||  || — || November 7, 1978 || Palomar || E. F. Helin, S. J. Bus || — || align=right | 3.4 km || 
|-id=960 bgcolor=#E9E9E9
| 99960 ||  || — || November 6, 1978 || Palomar || E. F. Helin, S. J. Bus || — || align=right | 1.6 km || 
|-id=961 bgcolor=#d6d6d6
| 99961 ||  || — || June 25, 1979 || Siding Spring || E. F. Helin, S. J. Bus || — || align=right | 6.1 km || 
|-id=962 bgcolor=#E9E9E9
| 99962 ||  || — || June 25, 1979 || Siding Spring || E. F. Helin, S. J. Bus || — || align=right | 3.0 km || 
|-id=963 bgcolor=#fefefe
| 99963 ||  || — || June 25, 1979 || Siding Spring || E. F. Helin, S. J. Bus || — || align=right | 1.7 km || 
|-id=964 bgcolor=#fefefe
| 99964 ||  || — || June 25, 1979 || Siding Spring || E. F. Helin, S. J. Bus || MAS || align=right | 1.1 km || 
|-id=965 bgcolor=#fefefe
| 99965 ||  || — || June 25, 1979 || Siding Spring || E. F. Helin, S. J. Bus || NYS || align=right data-sort-value="0.97" | 970 m || 
|-id=966 bgcolor=#fefefe
| 99966 ||  || — || June 25, 1979 || Siding Spring || E. F. Helin, S. J. Bus || NYS || align=right | 1.0 km || 
|-id=967 bgcolor=#FA8072
| 99967 ||  || — || July 24, 1979 || Siding Spring || S. J. Bus || — || align=right | 2.3 km || 
|-id=968 bgcolor=#E9E9E9
| 99968 ||  || — || August 22, 1979 || La Silla || C.-I. Lagerkvist || — || align=right | 2.3 km || 
|-id=969 bgcolor=#d6d6d6
| 99969 ||  || — || February 28, 1981 || Siding Spring || S. J. Bus || MEL || align=right | 7.7 km || 
|-id=970 bgcolor=#E9E9E9
| 99970 ||  || — || February 28, 1981 || Siding Spring || S. J. Bus || — || align=right | 5.0 km || 
|-id=971 bgcolor=#E9E9E9
| 99971 ||  || — || February 28, 1981 || Siding Spring || S. J. Bus || — || align=right | 4.7 km || 
|-id=972 bgcolor=#d6d6d6
| 99972 ||  || — || March 7, 1981 || Siding Spring || S. J. Bus || EOS || align=right | 4.6 km || 
|-id=973 bgcolor=#d6d6d6
| 99973 ||  || — || March 7, 1981 || Siding Spring || S. J. Bus || — || align=right | 9.1 km || 
|-id=974 bgcolor=#d6d6d6
| 99974 ||  || — || March 2, 1981 || Siding Spring || S. J. Bus || AEG || align=right | 6.2 km || 
|-id=975 bgcolor=#d6d6d6
| 99975 ||  || — || March 6, 1981 || Siding Spring || S. J. Bus || — || align=right | 10 km || 
|-id=976 bgcolor=#fefefe
| 99976 ||  || — || March 6, 1981 || Siding Spring || S. J. Bus || — || align=right | 1.7 km || 
|-id=977 bgcolor=#fefefe
| 99977 ||  || — || March 1, 1981 || Siding Spring || S. J. Bus || — || align=right | 1.3 km || 
|-id=978 bgcolor=#E9E9E9
| 99978 ||  || — || March 1, 1981 || Siding Spring || S. J. Bus || — || align=right | 3.7 km || 
|-id=979 bgcolor=#E9E9E9
| 99979 ||  || — || March 1, 1981 || Siding Spring || S. J. Bus || — || align=right | 1.3 km || 
|-id=980 bgcolor=#E9E9E9
| 99980 ||  || — || March 2, 1981 || Siding Spring || S. J. Bus || — || align=right | 2.6 km || 
|-id=981 bgcolor=#E9E9E9
| 99981 ||  || — || March 2, 1981 || Siding Spring || S. J. Bus || — || align=right | 5.5 km || 
|-id=982 bgcolor=#d6d6d6
| 99982 ||  || — || March 2, 1981 || Siding Spring || S. J. Bus || HIL3:2 || align=right | 9.5 km || 
|-id=983 bgcolor=#fefefe
| 99983 ||  || — || March 2, 1981 || Siding Spring || S. J. Bus || — || align=right | 1.7 km || 
|-id=984 bgcolor=#E9E9E9
| 99984 ||  || — || March 3, 1981 || Siding Spring || S. J. Bus || — || align=right | 5.1 km || 
|-id=985 bgcolor=#fefefe
| 99985 ||  || — || March 2, 1981 || Siding Spring || S. J. Bus || NYS || align=right | 1.4 km || 
|-id=986 bgcolor=#E9E9E9
| 99986 ||  || — || March 1, 1981 || Siding Spring || S. J. Bus || — || align=right | 4.2 km || 
|-id=987 bgcolor=#E9E9E9
| 99987 ||  || — || March 2, 1981 || Siding Spring || S. J. Bus || — || align=right | 3.1 km || 
|-id=988 bgcolor=#d6d6d6
| 99988 ||  || — || March 1, 1981 || Siding Spring || S. J. Bus || — || align=right | 6.3 km || 
|-id=989 bgcolor=#d6d6d6
| 99989 ||  || — || March 2, 1981 || Siding Spring || S. J. Bus || — || align=right | 6.2 km || 
|-id=990 bgcolor=#fefefe
| 99990 ||  || — || March 2, 1981 || Siding Spring || S. J. Bus || FLO || align=right | 1.6 km || 
|-id=991 bgcolor=#fefefe
| 99991 ||  || — || March 1, 1981 || Siding Spring || S. J. Bus || — || align=right | 1.3 km || 
|-id=992 bgcolor=#d6d6d6
| 99992 ||  || — || March 2, 1981 || Siding Spring || S. J. Bus || EUP || align=right | 9.6 km || 
|-id=993 bgcolor=#d6d6d6
| 99993 ||  || — || March 2, 1981 || Siding Spring || S. J. Bus || — || align=right | 4.7 km || 
|-id=994 bgcolor=#fefefe
| 99994 ||  || — || March 7, 1981 || Siding Spring || S. J. Bus || — || align=right | 2.9 km || 
|-id=995 bgcolor=#fefefe
| 99995 ||  || — || March 7, 1981 || Siding Spring || S. J. Bus || V || align=right | 1.0 km || 
|-id=996 bgcolor=#d6d6d6
| 99996 ||  || — || March 1, 1981 || Siding Spring || S. J. Bus || HYG || align=right | 5.2 km || 
|-id=997 bgcolor=#fefefe
| 99997 ||  || — || March 1, 1981 || Siding Spring || S. J. Bus || — || align=right | 3.3 km || 
|-id=998 bgcolor=#E9E9E9
| 99998 ||  || — || March 6, 1981 || Siding Spring || S. J. Bus || — || align=right | 2.6 km || 
|-id=999 bgcolor=#fefefe
| 99999 || 1981 FP || — || March 28, 1981 || Harvard Observatory || Harvard Obs. || NYS || align=right | 1.4 km || 
|-id=000 bgcolor=#fefefe
| 100000 Astronautica ||  ||  || September 28, 1982 || Palomar || J. Gibson || H || align=right data-sort-value="0.93" | 930 m || 
|}

References

External links 
 Discovery Circumstances: Numbered Minor Planets (95001)–(100000) (IAU Minor Planet Center)

0099